= Non-government reactions to the Russian invasion of Ukraine =

The Russian invasion of Ukraine led to widespread international condemnation by political parties and international organisations, as well as by people and groups in the areas of entertainment, media, business, and sport, where boycotts of Russia and Belarus also took place.

== Political parties, opposition politicians, and other political groups ==
=== Africa ===
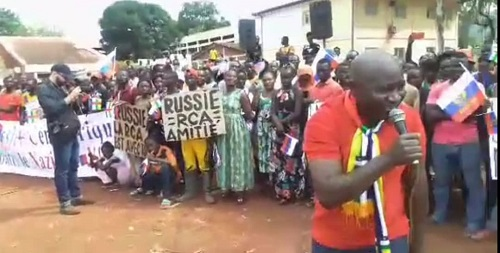
Demonstration in support of the invasion of Ukraine is held in the Central African Republic, a country whose government is closely allied with Russia.

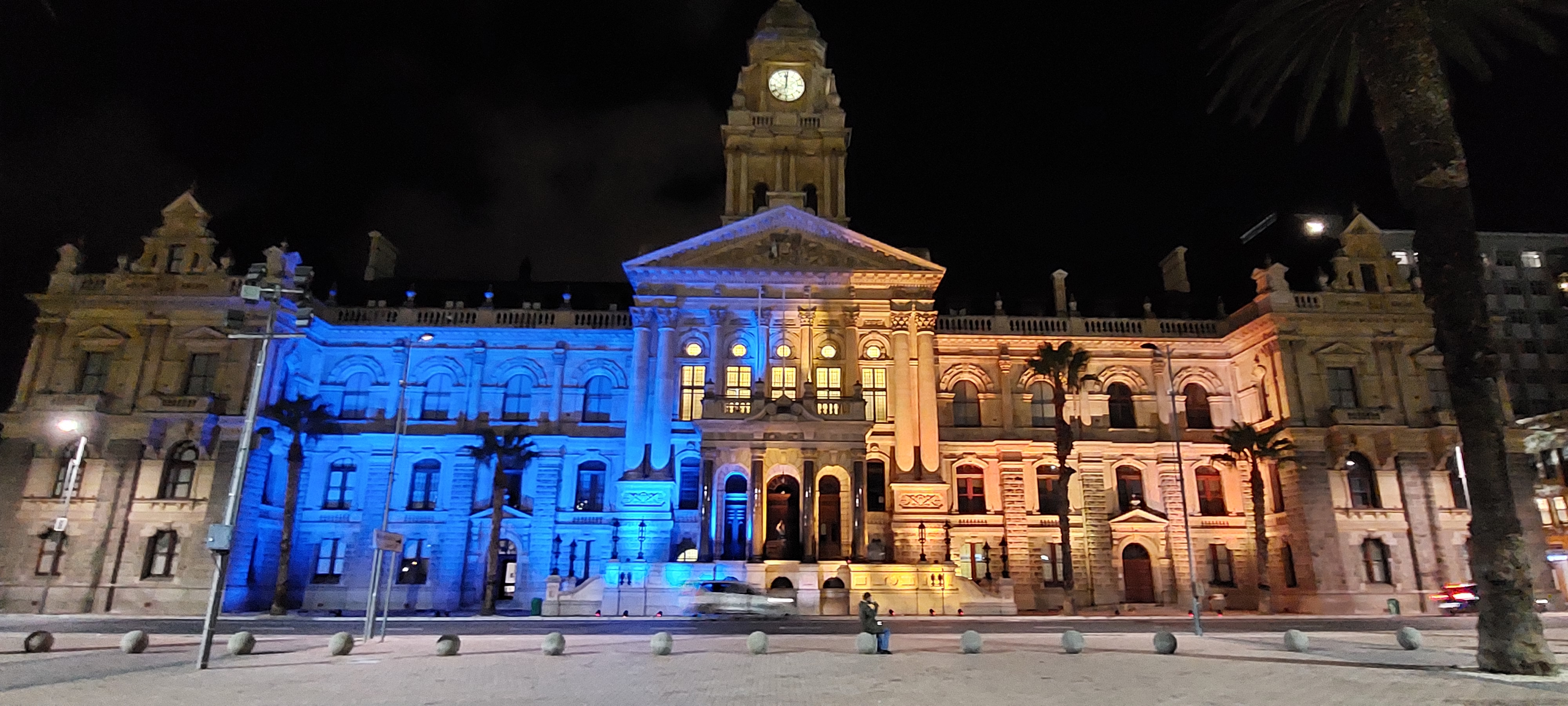
The Cape Town City Hall was lit up in solidarity with Ukraine despite the South African government's ambiguous position on the Russian invasion.

- Central African Republic
  - Demonstration in support of the Russian invasion on Ukraine was held in Bangui.
- South Africa
  - ActionSA party blasted South African government refusal to vote to condemn Russian aggression in a UN General Assembly vote.
  - African National Congress (ANC), the governing party of South Africa, called the EU sanctions on Russia "draconian," and demanded that the local satellite TV provider, MultiChoice, restore broadcasts from the Russian news channel Russia Today (RT).
  - Al Jamah-ah criticised the Democratic Alliance's decision to show solidarity for Ukraine by lighting up the Western Cape provincial government building in the colours of the Ukrainian flag.
  - Democratic Alliance (DA) called the ANC government to clarify its stance on Russian invasion of Ukraine. The party also claimed that there are several calls for South Africa as member of BRICS to act. The DA mayor of Cape Town pledged the city's support for and solidarity with the people of Kyiv and Ukraine. The DA-run Western Cape Government also showed solidarity for Ukraine by lighting up the provincial government buildings in the country's colours.
  - Economic Freedom Fighters supports Russia's invasion of Ukraine in what they referred to as "Russia's anti-imperialist programme" against NATO. The party has denounced the MultiChoice satellite TV provider for removing the RT channel from its DStv.
  - South African Communist Party in a joint statement with other communist parties around the world condemned the utilisation of reactionary political forces of Ukraine.

=== Asia ===
- Hong Kong
  - Activist and Demosisto founder Nathan Law stated that he stands with Ukraine. Law praised the courage of Ukrainians that changed the world attitude toward Putin.
  - There are small rallies being organized to support Ukraine. Also, a large number of Hong Kongers support Ukraine and condemn the Russian government.
- Indonesia
  - Free Papua Movement spokesman Sebby Sambom stated that Russia's military attack on Ukraine was justified because "Ukrainian military and police are committing genocide against native Ukrainian in two regions that wanted independence." He added that Indonesia should be silent since Indonesia and Ukraine were "evil countries and stooge of American Capitalist."
- India
  - Members of Hindu Sena took a march in support of Russia in Connaught Place, New Delhi.
- Iran
  - Mahmoud Ahmadinejad, the former president of Iran, declared support to Ukraine on Twitter, saying "Your honorable and almost unrivalled resistance uncovered the Satanic plots of enemies of mankind. Trust that the great nation of #Iran is standing by you, while admiring this heroic persistence."
  - Maryam Rajavi, President-elect of the National Council of Resistance of Iran, urged the nations that border Ukraine to expedite the relocation and assistance of Iranian refugees from Ukraine who have fled the mullahs’ oppression.
- Japan
  - Kazuo Shii, chairman of the Japanese Communist Party stated that Russia's actions are in violation of the basic principles of the United Nations Charter and international law, and that he resolutely condemns this. He further stated that it is totally unacceptable for President Putin to boast Russia's nuclear weapons to intimidate the countries of the world.
  - The Democratic Party for the People released a comment condemning Russia's military invasion into Ukraine and demanded that Russia "immediately cease its armed incursion".
- Malaysia
  - The Leader of the Opposition of the Dewan Rakyat, Anwar Ibrahim, called for "end of the attacks" by Russia before more loss of lives occurred.
  - The Malaysian Parliament's Select Committee for International Affairs described the situation as a "brutal invasion" by Russia, and condemned Russia for invading Ukraine. It also seeks to invite the Ministry of Foreign Affairs during its next session for a briefing on Malaysia's stance on the issue. It also pledged to make a courtesy call to the Ukrainian Ambassador to Malaysia to express the committee's 'deepest concern' surrounding the invasion.
- Palestine
  - The de facto governing party of the Gaza Strip, Hamas was said to have given alleged statements regarding the Ukrainian–Russian situation that the group denied.
- Philippines
  - A number of candidates in the 2022 Philippine presidential election have taken varying positions on Russia's invasion of Ukraine. During a presidential debate by CNN Philippines, six of the ten presidential candidates said the Philippines should not be neutral in the conflict, with three voting for neutrality.
    - Senator Panfilo Lacson condemned the invasion, saying that the Philippines should join the rest of the world in condemning Russia's actions despite the country only having a "small voice" in the international community. Vice President Leni Robredo released a statement also condemning the invasion, and expressing admiration for the "Ukrainian people's courage and resilience." International boxing star and senator Manny Pacquiao said war is not the solution to the problems between Russia and Ukraine, and it only risks the lives of citizens.
    - Isko Moreno, the mayor of Manila, said that the Philippines should focus on getting Filipinos out of Ukraine while remaining neutral in the conflict. Former senator Bongbong Marcos also initially said the Philippines need not make a stand on the conflict because "we are not involved, only our nationals." A few days later, however, he called on Russia to respect Ukraine's freedoms and rights.
    - Labor leader Leody de Guzman slammed the invasion and called Russia an "imperialist" power, later declaring that all forms of invasion and incursion into another sovereign nation are "unacceptable", but otherwise said that the Philippine government should remain non-aligned.
- Singapore
  - The main opposition party in Singapore, Workers' Party, stated that it was "gravely concerned" with Russia's military operations in Ukraine. The party affirmed "the right of all peoples to determine their own destiny", and expressed its hope for a peaceful settlement of the crisis in accordance with international law.
- Syria
  - National Coalition for Syrian Revolutionary and Opposition Forces condemned Russia's military intervention in Ukraine, and emphasized solidarity with the Ukrainian people.
- Taiwan
  - The Taiwanese opposition party Kuomintang condemned the attack against Ukraine. The party stated that it stands by the international community to take actions in order to restore peace. The party also reiterated its commitment to self-defence and to maintain peace and stability in the Taiwan Strait.
- Thailand
  - Pita Limjaroenrat, leader of the opposition Move Forward Party, called for Russia's immediate pull-out of its troops from Ukraine, and criticised the Thai Government's position as being "two-face".
- Yemen
  - Houthi's Supreme Political Council recognized both Donetsk and Luhansk as independent states.

=== Europe ===
- Armenia
  - The non-parliamentary European Party of Armenia and National Democratic Pole both participated in demonstrations against the invasion.
- Belarus
  - Belarusian opposition leader Sviatlana Tsikhanouskaya condemned Russia and Belarus's involvement in the invasion of Ukraine. Tsikhanouskaya decried that "Russia, with the participation of the Lukashenko regime, launched a groundless and shameless military aggression against Ukraine." Tsikhanouskaya asked the international community to impose the strongest sanctions against the Belarus regime as soon as possible, and called them "accomplices of Russia's brutal assault on Ukraine". She argued "It's evident that Lukashenko fully shares the responsibility for this unnecessary war."
- France
  - The Republicans tweeted that the party retains its full solidarity with Ukraine. The next day, leader Valérie Pécresse recommended Nicolas Sarkozy help negotiate an end to the conflict.
- Greece
  - The Communist Party of Greece (KKE) condemned "the imperialist war in Ukraine" by issuing an appropriate appeal, which was also signed by the communist parties of Spain (PCTE), Turkey (TKP), and Mexico (PCM).
- Georgia
  - Georgian civil activists, politicians held solidarity rally for Ukraine
  - Georgian people massively started enlisiting in Ukrainian battalions to fight against Russia
  - Georgian medics started volunteering in Ukraine
  - Georgia ranked 1st in Ukraine aid supply via mail, where Georgian nation donated 520 tones of humanitarian aid to Ukraine
  - The opposition United National Movement (UNM), Georgia's main opposition party, paid a surprise visit to Kyiv on the same day as the government of Georgia, sending a separate delegation that included party chairman Nika Melia and former Georgian President Giorgi Margvelashvili.
  - McDonalds of Georgia started providing food for free to Ukrainian children
- Moldova
  - Party of Socialists of the Republic of Moldova Opposition party in Moldova, during the 2022 Russian invasion of Ukraine, claimed that the West and Ukraine are responsible for the situation.
- Netherlands
  - Sjoerd Sjoerdsma, member of the Dutch House of Representatives, filed a motion to "look for ways to structurally invest extra in Defense during this Cabinet term", which received support from most parties. In The meanwhile, the Dutch send more heavy arms, and fire stationwagens and all the things that's attached to it. The Dutch have a close connection to the Ukrainian firefighters, so they are ready to jump in. Also, more firewapons will be delivered.
- Portugal
  - The Portuguese Communist Party (PCP) has been the sole political party represented in Portugal's Parliament to have avoided a clear condemnation of Russia's invasion from the start, choosing instead to repeatedly blame Ukraine and the West for the war:
    - On 24 February (the first day of the invasion), the party refused to condemn Russia, upon being explicitly invited to do so by Foreign Affairs Minister Augusto Santos Silva in a parliamentary debate. The communists stated that the conflict was "more profound" than "a problem between Russians and Ukrainians", and instead blamed the United States, accusing them of being "the party that is truly interested in having a new war in Europe" and of "promoting" it in order to "turn attentions away from internal problems" and to "ensure a large-scale sale of weapons".
    - On 1 March, the two communist members of the European Parliament voted against a resolution condemning the invasion. The party explained its decision by accusing the resolution of "fuelling the escalation", of "seeking to impose a unilateral view" and of "justifying the colossal process of increasing military expenditures, the strengthening and expansion of NATO and the militarisation of the EU". The document was approved with more than 600 votes in favour, 13 against and 26 abstentions.
    - On 8 March, the PCP's leader Jerónimo de Sousa blamed all entities involved in the war (Russia included, although referring to its actions by the Kremlin's language of a "military operation"). He stated the party condemned "the whole process of meddling and of confrontation which took place [in Ukraine], the US-promoted coup d'état in 2014, Russia's recent military intervention and the intensification of the bellicose escalation made by the US, NATO and the EU".
    - On 20 April, the PCP announced that it would not attend the Parliament's solemn session where President of Ukraine Volodymyr Zelenskyy would speak, the following day. The party's parliamentary leader Paula Santos rejected condoning "the participation of someone who personifies a xenophobic and bellicose power", calling the session a "stage to contribute for the escalation of war".
    - On 23 April, questioned by a journalist as to whether he considered that there was an invasion going on, party leader Jerónimo de Sousa replied: "There was a military operation which we have condemned." Following the journalist's insistence on the question, he rejected using the word 'invasion' and instead hesitantly responded: "At least, from the images we have... from the images we have, there is a conflict, there is a war. That is unavoidable and must be recognised."
- Romania
  - The Alliance for the Union of Romanians condemned recognition of DPR and LPR and called Russian activity "brutal aggression against Ukraine".
- Russia
  - Alexei Navalny, imprisoned Russian opposition leader and prominent critic of Putin, while on trial for charges that Amnesty International has described as politically motivated, asked the court to enter into the protocol his statement condemning the attack and saying: "This war between Russia and Ukraine was unleashed to cover up the theft from Russian citizens and divert their attention from problems that exist inside the country." Navalny also said that the war "will cause a great number of casualties, destroy lives and will further impoverish Russian citizens."
- Serbia
  - Vojislav Šešelj, the leader of the far-right Serbian Radical Party, said that the United States manipulated the Ukrainian President Volodymyr Zelenskyy and pushed him into a conflict with Russia.
  - People's Patrol, a far-right group, organized pro-Russian protests in March and April 2022 which were attended by around 4,000 people.
  - Boris Tadić, former president of Serbia and current leader of the Social Democratic Party, called the invasion "an act of aggression of Russia against Ukraine" and added that "Serbia cannot accept the recognition of Donetsk and Luhansk, because it is contrary to its own interests because of Kosovo and Metohija".
  - Opposition parties Party of Freedom and Justice and Together stated their support for sanctioning Russia, while Do not let Belgrade drown attended protests that were organized in support of Ukraine.
- Slovakia
  - Voice – Social Democracy party issued a statement of "unanimous condemnation of Russian invasion".
- Spain
  - Second Deputy Prime Minister Yolanda Díaz, Minister of Consumer Affairs Alberto Garzón and Minister of Social Rights Ione Belarra, all of them members of Unidas Podemos, a coalition which includes the PCE, condemned the Russian attack on Ukraine. Díaz expressed her solidarity "with the Ukrainian people, victims of this irresponsible escalation". Garzón affirmed that the "Ukrainian working people" were "suffering from imperialist aggression by Russia".
- Turkey
  - Ahmet Davutoğlu, former prime minister and Future Party leader, condemned the invasion.
  - Temel Karamollaoğlu, Felicity Party leader, condemned the invasion and stated that "efforts to resurrect the Soviet Union are a very serious threat to world peace."
  - Devlet Bahçeli, Nationalist Movement Party leader urged Russia to "stop the invasion immediately", adding that "the attempt to take Donbas away from Ukraine is separatism".
  - Doğu Perinçek, Patriotic Party leader, praised the invasion and stated that "it is the weapon that Russia is currently using that brings peace and tranquility."
  - Meral Akşener, Good Party leader, voiced support for Ukraine's self-defense, adding "That's why our hearts are beating for another nation. It is us who understand best the struggle given by Ukraine. I respectfully salute the brave sons of Ukraine. We are with them in their struggle for the freedom and sovereignty of their country".
- Ukraine
  - The Mejlis of the Crimean Tatar People, stated it is to recognize the Russian Federation – a terrorist state, and its political and military leadership – as international criminals over Russia's invasion of Ukraine.
  - Ukrainian forces have made substantial gains in Russia's Kursk region, prompting tens of thousands of residents to flee. Many locals are frustrated with the Russian government for understating the danger and delaying evacuations, while state media downplays the severity of the situation.
- United Kingdom
  - Keir Starmer, Labour Party leader and Leader of the Opposition in the British Parliament, stated that "Vladimir Putin's attack on Ukraine is unprovoked and unjustifiable", adding: "All those who believe in the triumph of democracy over dictatorship, good over evil, freedom over the jackboot of tyranny must now support the Ukrainian people."

=== North America ===
- Canada
  - Bloc Québécois leader Yves-François Blanchet described Russian military action in Ukraine as a "savage and violent attack" and called for "the toughest economic sanctions imaginable."
  - Conservative Party leader and Leader of the Official Opposition Candice Bergen condemned the invasion on Twitter, saying the party stands ready to defend Ukraine and that it deems Putin's actions "despicable". Bergen called it the "most serious threat to the rules-based order since 1945" and expressed that the Conservative Party "fully supports" the Canadian government's actions thus far.
  - Green Party interim leader Amita Kuttner condemned the invasion and called on the Canadian government to use every available non-violent tool to punish and isolate Russia for its "criminal decision" to attack Ukraine. Kuttner stated that "this lawless aggression must not stand."
    - Green Party of Quebec leader Alex Tyrrell published a thread on Twitter suggesting that Russia's perspective regarding Ukraine was reasonable. He added that while he was against the violence, he felt that Canada, the United States and the European Union should not supply Ukraine with weapons and materials, but should instead suggest that Ukraine engage in negotiations with Russia. His comments were met with opposition from Quebec politician Benoit Charette and from the federal Green Party, with a party spokesperson calling his views "abhorrent".
  - New Democratic Party (NDP) leader Jagmeet Singh issued a statement condemning Russia's flagrant aggression against Ukraine and urging the federal government to expand economic sanctions, target the wealth of Russian oligarchs and reiterated the Party's call since 2018 for Ukrainians to be granted visa-free access.
  - People's Party leader and former Foreign Minister Maxime Bernier released a statement on Twitter deploring the "Russian invasion in Ukraine" while stressing that Canada "has no business getting involved in this conflict. China is the biggest threat to our security. Western powers have horribly managed relations with Russia and pushed Russians in the arms of the Chinese."
  - Premier of Ontario Doug Ford said in a speech that “Last night, we witnessed a violent attack on a sovereign nation by a despot, a thug. “We witnessed Vladimir Putin's war of aggression begin in Ukraine.” Ontario said it would provide $300,000 in humanitarian aid for Ukrainians in need.
  - Premier of Québec François Legault condemned Russia's aggression in Ukraine and said “It's completely unacceptable what President Putin is doing, It's terrible what the Ukrainian people are going through.”
- Cuba
  - Manuel Cuesta Morúa, Cuban dissident and spokesperson of the Arco Progresista, questioned on Twitter the support of Western Hemisphere's leftist governments for Russia. Morúa said, "What does the revolutionary left in this hemisphere say in the face of #Putin's criminal attempt to destroy and appropriate #Ukraine? Does the right to national existence depend on ideology? Behind anti-Americanism, this left hides its weakness for #China and #Russia".
  - Cuban journalist Yoani Sánchez also criticized the Cuban government's "double standards on invasions of other nations". Sánchez decried that "In 1968 Fidel Castro applauded the entry of Soviet tanks into Prague; now Miguel Díaz-Canel does not condemn the Russian invasion of Ukraine... and the official press justifies it based on 'security' reasons."
- Mexico
  - Mexico's National Action Party and Institutional Revolutionary Party each condemned the Russian invasion, with National Action Party member Santiago Creel blaming Putin for starting a world war.
- Nicaragua
  - Exiled Nicaraguan journalist Berta Valle, stated, "Our country is hosting an army that commits atrocities against civilians in Ukraine".
- United States
  - House Minority Leader Kevin McCarthy criticized the invasion as "reckless and evil", and vowing that the US will stand with Ukraine against attempts to "rewrite history" and "upend the balance of power in Europe".
  - Senate Minority Leader Mitch McConnell urged the US government to provide aid to Ukraine, saying the government needs "to do everything we can to make this Russian incursion painful on the Russians who are engaged in it."
  - Former Presidents Jimmy Carter, Bill Clinton, George W. Bush, and Barack Obama issued statements condemning the invasion, with Obama saying the Ukrainian people chose a path of sovereignty, self-determination, and democracy. Bush said Russia's war on Ukraine constitutes the gravest security crisis on the European continent since World War II. Clinton said Putin's "war of choice has unraveled 30 years of diplomacy and put millions of innocent lives in grave danger." Carter said Russia's "unprovoked attack on Ukraine using military and cyber weapons violates international law and the fundamental human rights of the Ukrainian people.", while former president Donald Trump criticized the invasion, calling Putin "smart", and blames Biden for not doing enough.
  - Various state governments announced that all imported vodka from Russia would be removed from store shelves and bars. As of 28 February 2022, governors and state agencies endorsing and enacting such limitations include Utah governor Spencer Cox, Ohio governor Mike DeWine, New Hampshire governor Chris Sununu, and Pennsylvania's liquor control board.
  - Senator Lindsey Graham called for the Russian people to "take out Putin", asking if there is "a Brutus in Russia". Graham received wide-reaching bipartisan condemnation for his remarks implying the assassination of a head of state, including from Representatives Ilhan Omar, and Marjorie Taylor Greene, US Ambassador to the Czech Republic Norm Eisen, and fellow Senator Ted Cruz.
  - On 26 February 2022, the Democratic Socialists of America issued a statement condemning Russia's invasion of Ukraine while also calling for the United States to withdraw from NATO and "end the imperialist expansionism that set the stage for this conflict." According to Intelligencer, "The suggestion that the U.S. was somehow to blame for Vladimir Putin's war of aggression was seized on by the DSA's critics across the ideological spectrum — from the New York Post to Democratic congressional candidate Max Rose — while setting off a round of recriminations and counterstatements among American leftists." Critics also described the suggestion as "tone deaf".
  - U.S. Republican congress member Madison Cawthorn called Ukrainian President Volodymyr Zelenskyy a "thug" and said that the Ukrainian government was "incredibly evil". Another Republican Representative, Marjorie Taylor Greene, backed Cawthorn and also claimed that Zelenskyy was "corrupt".
  - In April 2022, U.S. President Joe Biden called Russia's invasion a "genocide" during an event on fuel prices.
  - U.S. Democratic politician and former candidate Tulsi Gabbard has shown sympathy towards the Russia's invasion of Ukraine, opposed the economic sanctions against Russia and falsely claimed that "media freedom in Russia is not so different to that of the United States". Because of her pro-Putin statements, the Security Service of Ukraine added Gabbard's name to a list of public figures whom it alleges promote Kremlin's propaganda.

=== South America ===
- Argentina
  - The opposition Juntos por el Cambio condemned the Russian invasion, repudiated the difficult situation and made a call to respect the United Nations and international laws. Some of their politicians also went to protests at the local Russian embassy.
  - The City of Buenos Aires also condemned the Russian invasion and the Obelisk of Buenos Aires was illuminated with the colors of the Ukraine flag in support of the country.
- Bolivia
  - Former president and opposition leader Carlos Mesa decried the Russian invasion as "imperialist" and demanded that the Bolivian government release an official condemnation.
  - Former president Evo Morales blamed U.S. "interventionism" for triggering Russia's invasion of Ukraine.
  - Former president Jorge Quiroga urged 21st century socialists and Chavistas, "who for years stirred up ghosts of U.S. invasions that NEVER materialized", to now condemn Russia's breach of Ukrainian sovereignty.
- Brazil
  - Former president and current pre-candidate for the presidency Luiz Inácio Lula da Silva from the Workers' Party, said, "It is regrettable that, in the second decade of the 21st century, we have countries trying to settle their differences, whether territorial, political or commercial, through bombs, shots, attacks, when they should have been settled at the negotiating table".
    - Lula would later claim on the Time magazine that Zelenskyy is "just as guilty for the war" and that he could have had "negotiated more". Ukrainian officials later criticized his claims, saying that he was "misinformed", later also calling him for a hearing. Some time later, he would also criticize Joe Biden for supporting Ukraine, claiming that "he never did one speech to help the starving Africans, but sent US$40 billion to Ukraine".
    - The Worker's Party also posted on Twitter a post criticizing the US for "long-term aggressive policies against Russia", as well as NATO and the EU for "continuous expansion to the Russian borders", the post was later removed.
  - Pre-candidates for the presidency Ciro Gomes (Democratic Labour Party) and André Janones (Forward) have condemned the invasion of Ukraine on social media.
  - Other pre-candidates for the election, including João Doria (Brazilian Social Democracy Party), Sergio Moro (Brazil Union), Simone Tebet (Brazilian Democratic Movement) and Felipe D'Avilla (New Party) signed an open letter criticizing the invasion and calling for peace, they had also individually criticized the invasion on the first day.
- Uruguay
  - The Broad Front, main opposition party in the country, released a statement expressing their preoccupation regarding the conflict's escalation while lamenting that, if the conflict continued, it could have grave consequences for both countries and the international community as well. The statement also called for "restraint, reciprocal respect, dialogue and diplomacy between the involved parts in order to reach a prompt resolution of the conflict, all within the framework of the principles stated in the Charter of the United Nations and all norms of international law".
- Venezuela
  - Disputed President and opposition leader Juan Guaidó condemned "the unjustifiable and heinous military invasion perpetrated" by Russia of Ukraine and accused the president, Nicolás Maduro, of supporting it. In a statement, "We express our support for the Ukrainian people and President (Volodymir) Zelenskyy after the unjustifiable and heinous military invasion perpetrated by President Putin, backed by the dictatorship of Nicolás Maduro".
  - Diosdado Cabello, the second most important man of the Bolivarian Revolution and member of the National Assembly of Venezuela, suggested Venezuela to carry out a similar operation in Colombia to that of Russia in Ukraine.
  - Chavista groups painted a mural in the Catia parish, in Caracas, depicting and supporting Vladimir Putin and late President Hugo Chávez. The mural included the Z military symbol.

=== Oceania ===
- Australia
  - Opposition leader Anthony Albanese from the Australian Labor Party stated that it was "a grave moment for humanity" and that Australia and its allies must hold Russia to account for their "shameful act of aggression".
- New Zealand
  - Opposition MP from New Zealand National Party, Gerry Brownlee has suggested the government to expel Russian ambassador from New Zealand.
  - Opposition leader Christopher Luxon has also called the expulsion of Russian ambassador from New Zealand.

=== International ===
- The International Democrat Union released a statement supporting Ukraine and called Russian military activity in Ukraine "an attack on freedom and democracy itself".
- The Liberal International Bureau released a statement "on Vladimir Putin's unconscionable invasion of Ukraine" and demanded international support of Ukraine and unequivocal cessation of hostilities. On 25 February Liberal International President Hakima El Haite reaffirmed organization's support of Ukraine.
- The Progressive Alliance, in its statement, called Russian military intervention in Ukraine "violation of Ukrainian sovereignty and territorial integrity, of International Law, an attack on Democracy", adding that there is no possible justification of such type of action. It also announced "solidarity with Ukraine and Ukrainian people".
- The Socialist International, in press release, announced that organization "wholly condemns the Russian invasion of Ukraine" added that it "rejects the claims made by the Russian president over the sovereign territory of Ukraine and its allegations of oppression and genocide, repeated as a pretext for the invasion that began this morning". On 7 March, the Socialist International expelled A Just Russia — For Truth party, which supported Putin's actions in Ukraine, on the basis of violation of Ethical Charter and Declaration of Principles of the SI.
- The Progressive International released a statement, expressing support to "the victims of the Putin government's brutal invasion in Ukraine and with the people in Russia suffering from a war that the people did not choose" and called on progressive forces "to push for an immediate diplomatic solution that protects all refugees, guarantees the universal right to self-determination, and moves to dismantle all military-industrial alliances like NATO that endanger peace across the world". In response to such statement, Lewica Razem withdrew from the Progressive International, denouncing "the absence of declaration recognising Ukraine's sovereignty and an absolute condemnation of Russian imperialism".
- The Fourth International released a statement condemning the Russian invasion and calling for the immediate withdrawal of Russian forces from Ukraine, while also expressing support for military aid to Ukraine, sanctions against Russia and cancelling Ukraine's foreign debt.
- The International Workers' League – Fourth International released a statement condemning the invasion and calling for the immediate withdrawal of Russian forces from Ukraine and pro-Russian militias from Donbas and expressing support for Ukraine's right of self-determination and devolution of Crimea.

== International human rights organizations ==
- Amnesty International Secretary General Agnès Callamard stated that the invasion "is likely to lead to the most horrific consequences for human lives and human rights" and called for "all parties to adhere strictly to international humanitarian law and international human rights law." The human rights organization also reported that Ukrainian forces have put civilians in harm's way by establishing bases and operating weapons systems in populated residential areas, including in schools and hospitals, as they repelled the Russian invasion. Such tactics violated international humanitarian law and endangered civilians.
- International Committee of the Red Cross President Peter Maurer stated that the "intensification and spread of the conflict risk a scale of death and destruction that are frightening to contemplate" and that "our teams now in Ukraine will continue their work to repair vital infrastructure, support health facilities with medicines and equipment, and support families with food and hygiene items."
- Médecins Sans Frontières, who were already operating in Ukraine prior to the invasion, have stated that the rapid changes in the context have necessitated reduction and cessation of certain previously offered medical services, but that the organization is rapidly re-deploying to focus on the providing general emergency care to those who may need it.
- Memorial described the invasion as "a crime against peace and humanity" and said that it "will remain a shameful chapter in the Russian history."
- Reporters Without Borders Eastern Europe and Central Asia desk head Jeanne Cavelier stated that "We are familiar with Russia's methods... Journalists are prime targets, as we have seen in Crimea since its annexation in 2014, and in the territories controlled by Kremlin-backed separatists in the Donbass region" and called for "Russian and Ukrainian authorities to respect their international obligations regarding the protection of journalists during conflicts."

== Designated terrorist groups ==
- Islamic State of Iraq and the Levant released a statement on 17 April 2022, vowing to taking advantage of Ukraine war and ‘revenge’ for ex-leader's death, as a blessed campaign to take revenge” over the death of Abu Ibrahim al-Qurashi and the group's former spokesman. The group's new spokesman also called on supporters to resume attacks in Europe, taking advantage of the “available opportunity” of “the crusaders fighting each other".
  - On 8 August 2022, the group's new magazine praised devastation and accuses the west of defaming Putin, and welcomed the "great war waged by Russia, China, and North Korea" ahead. It claims the Russian invasion proved to be “a blessed war” and a “Crusaders vs Crusaders war; Crusaders invading Crusaders; Crusaders massacring Crusaders; Crusaders desecrating the sanctity of people of cross.”

== Non-governmental organizations, non-political groups and individuals ==
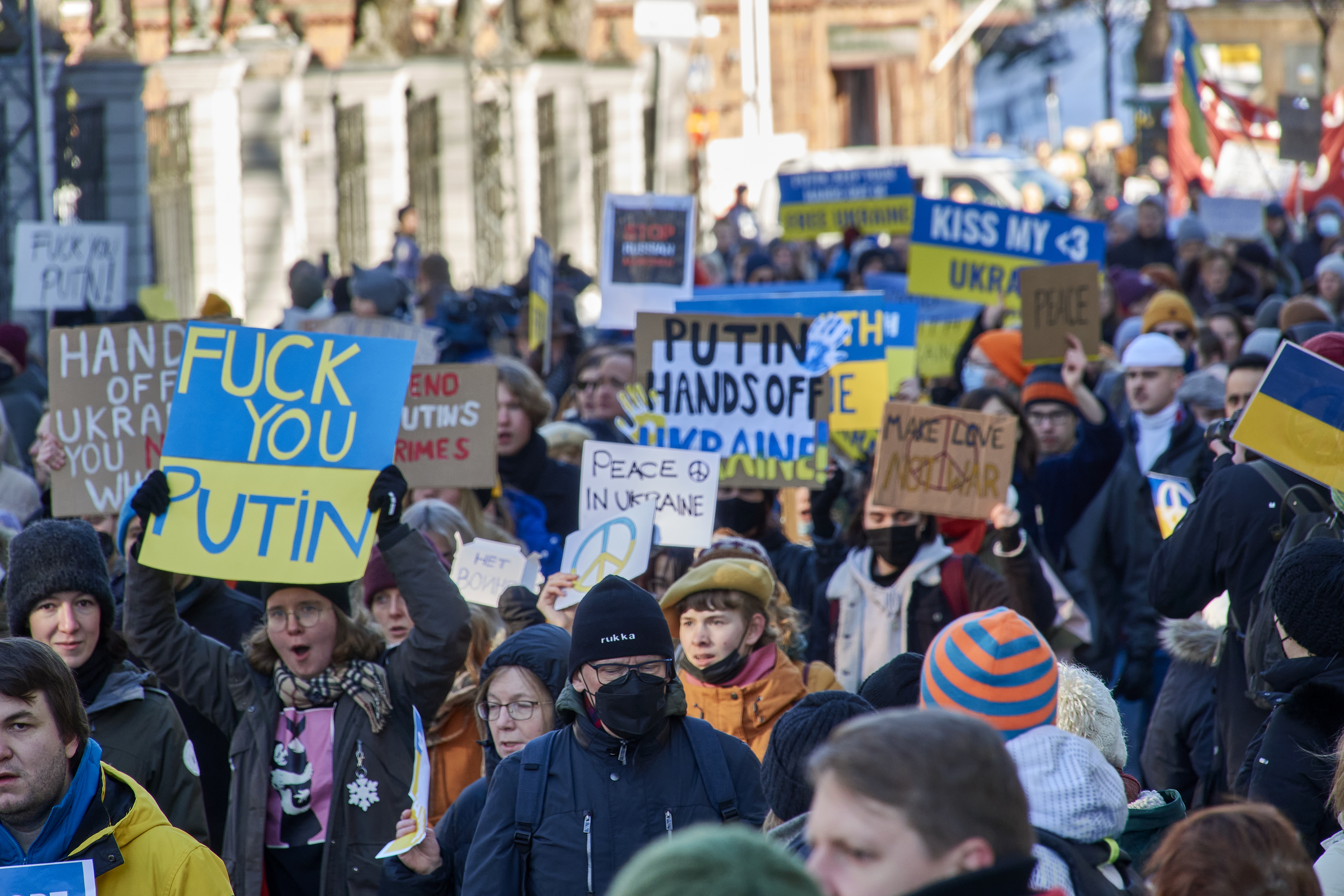
Anti-war protest in Helsinki, Finland, 26 February 2022

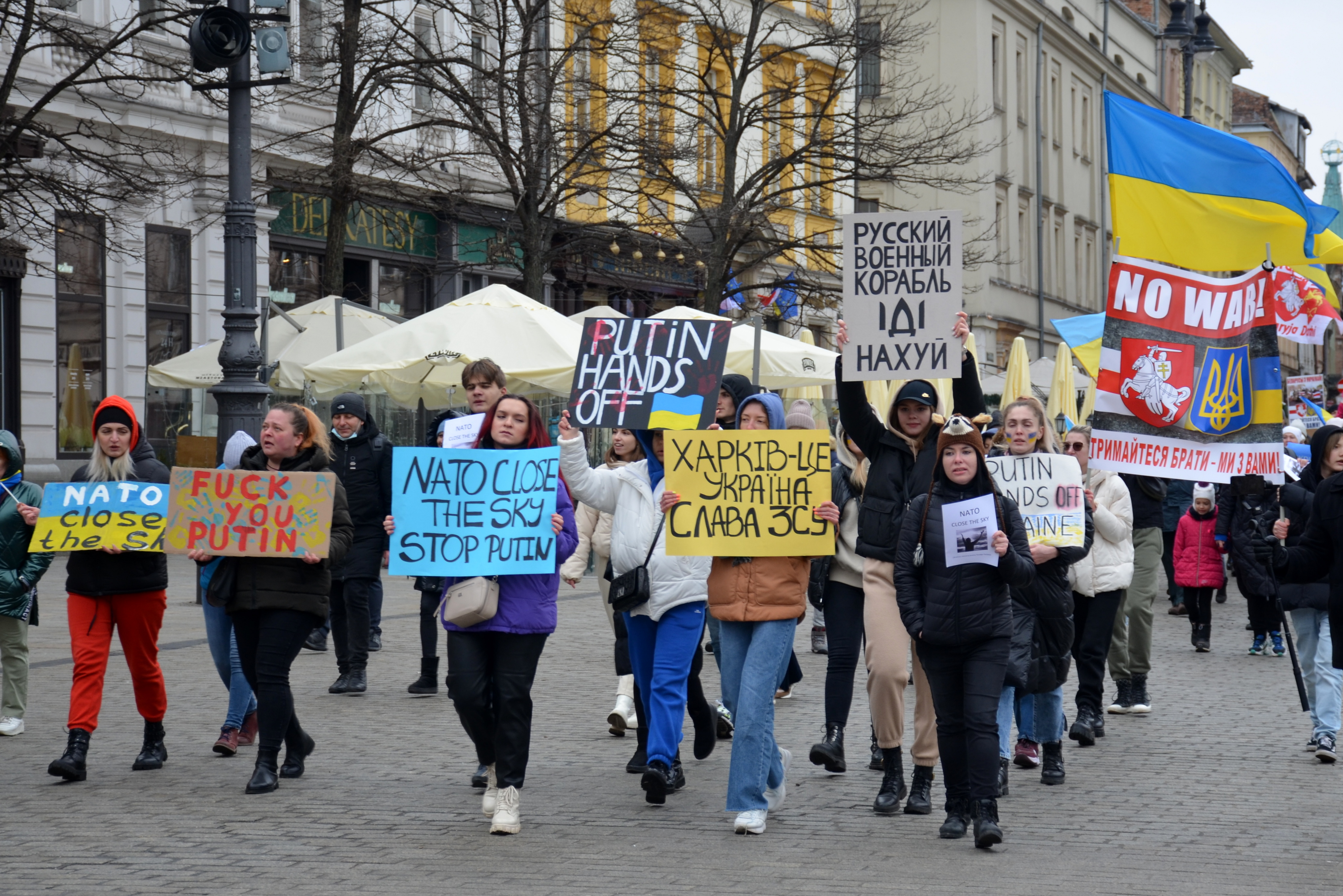
Ukrainian refugees in Kraków protest against the war, 6 March 2022

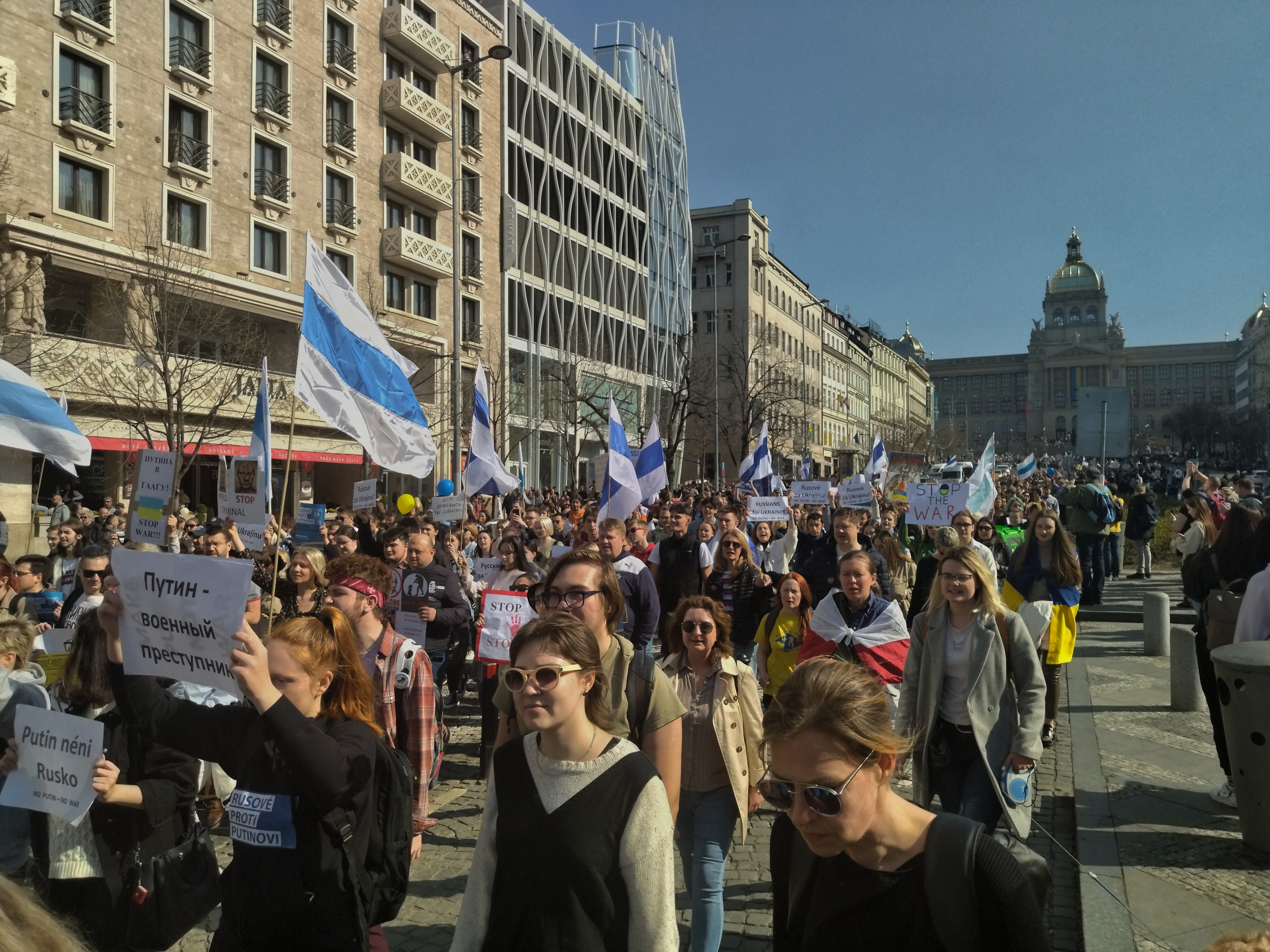
Protest of Russians living in the Czech Republic, 26 March 2022. The white-blue-white flag has been used by Russian anti-war protesters.

- Greenpeace posted a picture depicting the statement "No War" and a peace symbol.
- International Red Cross and Red Crescent Movement. The ICRC deployed one of its largest contingencies to Ukraine, where the organization is active since 2014, working closely with the Ukrainian Red Cross Society. The ICRC was active primarily in the disputed regions of the Donbas and Donetsk, assisting persons injured by armed confrontations when open hostilities between Russian and Ukrainian armed forces broke out on 24 February 2022. Thereafter the fighting moved to more populated areas in the Eastern Ukraine. The head of the ICRC delegation in Kyiv warned on 26 February 2022 that neighborhoods of major cities are becoming the frontline with significant consequences for their populations, including children, the sick and elderly. The ICRC urgently called on all parties to the conflict not to forget their obligations under international humanitarian law to ensure the protection of the civilian population and infrastructure, and respect the dignity of refugees and prisoners of war.
- The Wikimedia Foundation released a statement on 1 March, calling for "continued access to free and open knowledge" and for "an immediate and peaceful resolution to the conflict."
- The Georgian Wikipedia changed its logo to reflect the blue and gold coloring of Ukraine's flag.
- The YMCA launched a global fundraiser to support Ukrainian citizens fleeing the violence. Additionally, the YMCA of England and Wales has released a statement condemning the invasion.
- United Hatzalah of Israel sent an initial team of 15 medical personnel to assist Ukrainian refugees in Moldova and then expanded the operation to a group of 55 rotating doctors, paramedics, EMTs, and support staff who provided free medical treatment to refugees as well as delivered food and humanitarian aid to refugees. The EMS organization then began utilizing its Ukrainian based volunteers as well as those who came from Israel, to deliver food and medical supplies to hospitals and medical clinics inside Ukraine, while extricating injured and ill people out of Ukraine to receive care in other countries. They airlifted 3,000 Ukrainian refugees to Israel in an operation codenamed Operation Orange Wings.
- Klaus Schwab and Børge Brende of the World Economic Forum said that they "deeply condemn the aggression by Russia against Ukraine, the attacks and atrocities." and that "Our full solidarity is with Ukraine's people and all those who are suffering innocently from this totally unacceptable war."
- Author, activist and Nobel Peace Prize laureate Malala Yousafzai condemned the ongoing war in Ukraine and called for Russia to immediately halt its attacks on Ukraine.
- Venezuelan Sakharov Prize recipient and human rights activist, Lorent Saleh, expressed his support for Ukraine, saying that "It is an ethical issue to support those who stand up to great tyrannies" and that Putin "will always try to expand his regime using violence, blackmail and terror".
- The Duke and Duchess of Sussex spoke out against the attacks on the website of their foundation, Archewell, saying "Prince Harry and Meghan, The Duke and Duchess of Sussex and all of us at Archewell stand with the people of Ukraine against this breach of international and humanitarian law and encourage the global community and its leaders to do the same". As they collected an award at the 53rd NAACP Image Awards ceremony on 26 February, the Duke also acknowledged the people of Ukraine and supported them. In March 2022, their foundation Archewell made donations to charities that support Ukrainian people, including HIAS (Helping Ukrainian Families Settle), World Central Kitchen, the World Health Organization, and the HALO Trust, as well as media platforms that fight against misinformation such as The Kyiv Independent and Are We Europe.
- Sarah, Duchess of York, travelled to Poland in March 2022 to meet with Ukrainian refugees and help her charity the Sarah's Trust in organising goods donated by UK citizens.
- In Russia, more than 30,000 technology workers; 6,000 medical workers; 3,400 architects; 4,300 teachers; 17,000 artists; 5,000 scientists; 1,200 students, faculty and staff of Moscow State Institute of International Relations (MGIMO); and 2,000 actors, directors, and other creative figures signed petitions calling for Putin's government to stop the war.
- A statement was published on behalf of the former Imperial House of Russia – the House of Romanov, calling for the "immediate implemantation of peace".

=== Corporations ===
- On 8 March 2022, the World Bank approved $723 million help package in loans and grants for Ukraine in support of defending its citizens against the Russian invasion.

=== Former politicians ===
- Arkady Dvorkovich, who served as Deputy Prime Minister of the Russian Federation from 2012 to 2018, condemned the invasion and said his thoughts are 'with Ukrainian civilians'.
- Tulsi Gabbard stated that the United States is trying to turn Ukraine into another Afghanistan.
- Gerhard Schröder, former chancellor of Germany, chairman of Russian energy company Rosneft, and friend of Putin, called for an end of the hostilities and to the suffering of Ukrainians, blaming both sides for past errors. In turn, Saskia Esken, co-leader of the Social Democratic Party of Germany, of which Schröder is a member, called on him to give up his mandates for Rosneft and Gazprom, companies that she named "infrastructure of a bloody war of aggression". A few days later, Schröder's chief of staff and three other employees resigned from their positions following Schröder's refusal to relinquish their posts, while German chancellor Olaf Scholz joined the criticism on Schröder's mandates. The former chancellor stepped down from his position at Rosneft on 20 May after numerous calls for resignation including from Germany and EU, being stripped of certain state privileges.
- Angela Merkel, former chancellor of Germany, said about the Russian invasion, that there is "no justification for this blatant breach of international law, and I wholeheartedly condemn it", wholly supporting her successor Olaf Scholz' actions.
- Former prime minister of the United Kingdom Tony Blair, Gordon Brown and David Cameron have condemned the invasion. Tony Blair said "I am confident that in the end Ukraine will emerge as a strong independent nation. And in the end, this aggression may well herald the downfall of Putin". Gordon Brown said "In the spirit of the 1942 agreement, I and more than 100 former and current European leaders and international lawyers are urging the U.S. to join us in supporting a special tribunal to try Putin for his crimes of aggression.". David Cameron advocated for boycotting Russia from the G20 in a Wall Street Journal opinion piece.
- Former president of Ukraine Petro Poroshenko appeared on TV with a Kalashnikov rifle together with the civil defense forces on the streets of Kyiv. He also stated that he believed that "Putin will never conquer Ukraine, no matter how many soldiers he has, how many missiles he has, how many nuclear weapons he has... We Ukrainians are a free people, with a great European future. This is definitely so."
- Former prime minister of France François Fillon, former prime minister of Italy Matteo Renzi, former Finnish prime minister Esko Aho and former Austrian chancellor Christian Kern resigned from their positions on the boards of Russian companies as a form of protest. Wolfgang Schüssel, another former Austrian Chancellor, remained in the board of directors of the Russian energy corporation Lukoil.
- Former president of Bolivia Eduardo Rodríguez Veltzé stated that the Bolivian government's refusal to condemn the Russian invasion constituted a violation of the country's Constitution.
- Former presidents of the United States Jimmy Carter, Bill Clinton, George W. Bush, and Barack Obama have condemned the invasion. Jimmy Carter said, "I condemn this unjust assault on the sovereignty of Ukraine that threatens security in Europe and the entire world, and I call on President Putin to halt all military action and restore peace." Bill Clinton said, "I stand with President Biden, our allies, and freedom-loving people around the world in condemning Russia's unprovoked and unjustified invasion of Ukraine." Barack Obama said, "People of conscience around the world need to loudly and clearly condemn Russia's actions and offer support for the Ukrainian people. And every American, regardless of party, should support President Biden's efforts, in coordination with our closest allies, to impose hard-hitting sanctions on Russia — sanctions that impose a real price on Russia's autocratic elites". George W. Bush said, "Russia's attack on Ukraine constitutes the gravest security crisis on the European continent since World War II. I join the international community in condemning Vladimir Putin's unprovoked and unjustified invasion of Ukraine."
  - Former president Donald Trump praised Vladimir Putin and attacked the Biden administration, claiming Russia's invasion was due to the result of the United States' withdrawal from Afghanistan, policies involving the Green New Deal, as well as alleged election fraud in the 2020 United States presidential election. Trump was widely criticized both by opposing Democrats and by fellow Republican, Utah Senator Mitt Romney for his remarks. Trump later called the invasion of Ukraine "a Holocaust".
    - Former Trump advisor Roger Stone made pro-Russian comments in March 2022 claiming that Putin was acting defensively due to "dual launch missile pads in Ukraine aimed at the Soviet Union".
- Former prime minister of Japan Shinzo Abe condemned the invasion: "It is a serious challenge to the international order we have created after the war, and we cannot forgive it." He also said that Japan should arrange for nuclear sharing with the US, similar to NATO.
- Former prime minister of Canada Stephen Harper condemned the invasion: "No matter how long it takes, this territorial conquest of a peaceful neighbor must never be recognized.... They must be sanctioned, excluded, and punished at every turn."
- Former president of Mongolia Tsakhiagiin Elbegdorj has condemned the invasion. "I met my wife there [Ukraine]. My first son was born there. It's a close subject to my heart to look at those cities with such memories. When Hitler's Germany attacked the USSR, Mongolia helped today's Russia with all they could. But for my stance towards a sovereign and free country, IN MY OPINION, the Russian citizens who oppose this war are numerous... We are with the millions of Russians who oppose this war. We support them. On the other hand, we must express our support to the Ukrainian people who are bravely fighting to protect their motherland and freedom".
- Former advisor to President Vladimir Putin and Kremlin insider Sergei Markov claimed that the Russian invasion of Ukraine was not a "war between Russia and Ukraine, it's a war between Russia and (the) United States puppet who now occupy Ukraine. It's liberation of Ukraine and it's a proxy war of United States against Russia. We believe there's no independent Ukrainian government and this government is wholly under the control of the United States security community." Markov later admitted that the war in Ukraine was more difficult "than had been expected. It was expected that 30 to 50 percent of the Ukrainian Armed Forces would switch over to Russia's side. No one is switching over."

=== Science and technology ===
- Broadly, many scientists publicly condemned the invasion, some supported further science-related sanctions, and some called for accelerating the renewable energy transition/decarbonization (i.e. for Russian fossil fuels sanctions and due to e.g. increased public acceptance of increased energy prices and uncomfortable energy conservation measures). Few also used or developed Web-based coordination tools. After the immediate reactions, scientists also reported projections alongside policy-recommendations on issues concerning the impacts of the war – such as of diseases and food security/the global food system.
- Russian scientists and science journalists posted an open letter, calling the invasion of Ukraine "unfair and frankly senseless", noting that the resulting international isolation would mean "that we, scientists, will no longer be able to do our job normally: After all, conducting scientific research is unthinkable without full cooperation with colleagues from other countries". It was signed by around 7,750 Russians before it became a criminal offense with a risk for up to 15 years in prison to "call the invasion of Ukraine anything but a 'special military operation"' and the website was taken offline.
- 203 Nobel Prize winners signed an open letter in support of Ukraine, urging Russia to stop the war. The scientists compare the actions of Vladimir Putin with the Nazi invasion of Poland in 1939 and Hitler's subsequent invasion of the Soviet Union in 1941.
- NASA said that American astronauts and Russian cosmonauts currently aboard the International Space Station (ISS) would continue normal operations despite the invasion.
- The European Space Agency (ESA) Director General Josef Aschbacher tweeted that he was sad and worried about the aggression and the organization would continue to monitor the "evolving" situation, but would continue to work on all programs including the ISS and ExoMars launch campaigns along with Russia. On 17 March 2022, the ESA Council unanimously voted to suspend cooperation with Russia on ExoMars.
- Since March, at least one scientific journal enacted an immediately-applicable publishing boycott against Russia-located researchers or institutions.
- On February 26, 2022, the American Physical Society (APS) condemned the invasion. It noted the worsening situation of the bombing of major cities and the attacks on the Kharkiv Institute of Physics and Technology and the Department of Physics and Technology of Karazin University in Kharkiv. The APS decried the Russian military operations upon or near all nuclear facilities in Ukraine and especially the attacks upon the Zaporizhzhia Nuclear Power Plant. The APS suspended programmatic activities with Russian institutions and abides by all sanctions imposed by the United States, while supporting individual physicists adversely affected by the invasion, regardless of nationality, ethnicity, location, or residence.
- The Fédération Aéronautique Internationale (FAI) suspended the memberships of Russia and Belarus as a result of the war.
- The International Congress of Mathematicians was scheduled to host the 2022 Conference in St. Petersburg in July 2022. Many mathematical societies called for it to be canceled and withdrew delegates. On 26 February, the International Mathematical Union announced the conference would be moved online.
- The Alliance of German Research Organisations led by the German Research Foundation DFG and including the German Rectors' Conference issued a statement to freeze all collaborations with Russian institutions and business companies and to stop all joint scientific events, new collaborations should not be initiated either. Moreover, they will continue cooperation with Ukrainian institutions and support students and scientists who have to leave their country because of the Russian invasion.
- In a meeting of the Intergovernmental Panel on Climate Change, the Russian head of delegation Oleg Anisimov, a scientist at the State Hydrological Institute, apologized on behalf of the Russian people, denounced the invasion as unjustified, and expressed admiration towards the Ukrainian delegation for continuing to participate in conferences. The comments came after his Ukrainian counterpart Svitlana Krakovska made a speech connecting the war to climate change and called for an end to fossil fuel dependency. Anisimov's declaration was described as a rare rebuke of the invasion by a Russian government official, although he clarified to AFP that his statements "expressed my personal opinion and attitude," and should not be taken as an "official statement of the Russian delegation".
- CERN decided not to engage in any new collaborations with Russia and later declared its intention to terminate the cooperation agreements with Russia and Belarus at their expiration dates in 2024.
- The Venezuelan Academy of Physical, Mathematical, and Natural Sciences rejected Nicolás Maduro's position of support to Vladimir Putin and expressed its solidarity with the Ukrainian people after the invasion.

=== Religious institutions ===
- The Metropolitan of Kyiv and All Ukraine Epiphanius (Orthodox Church of Ukraine) condemned the invasion and exhorted Ukrainians to fight against the Russian aggression, invoking God's help to win the battle.
- The Major Archbishop of Kyiv and Halych Sviatoslav Shevchuk (Ukrainian Greek Catholic Church) condemned the invasion and wrote in the Ukrayinska Pravda that protecting the Motherland was a natural right and a civic duty.
- Metropolitan Onufriy of Kyiv, primate of the Ukrainian Orthodox Church (Moscow Patriarchate), stated that Russia had started military actions against Ukraine, and urged Ukrainians to show love for their homeland and each other. He also appealed directly to Putin, asking for an immediate end to the "fratricidal war".
- Around 500 Eastern Orthodox scholars signed a Declaration on the "Russian World" Teaching on 13 March 2022, calling it an "ideology" that underpins the invasion, "a heresy," and "a form of religious fundamentalism" that is "totalitarian in character." Using biblical texts to support their declaration, they condemned six "pseudo theological facets".

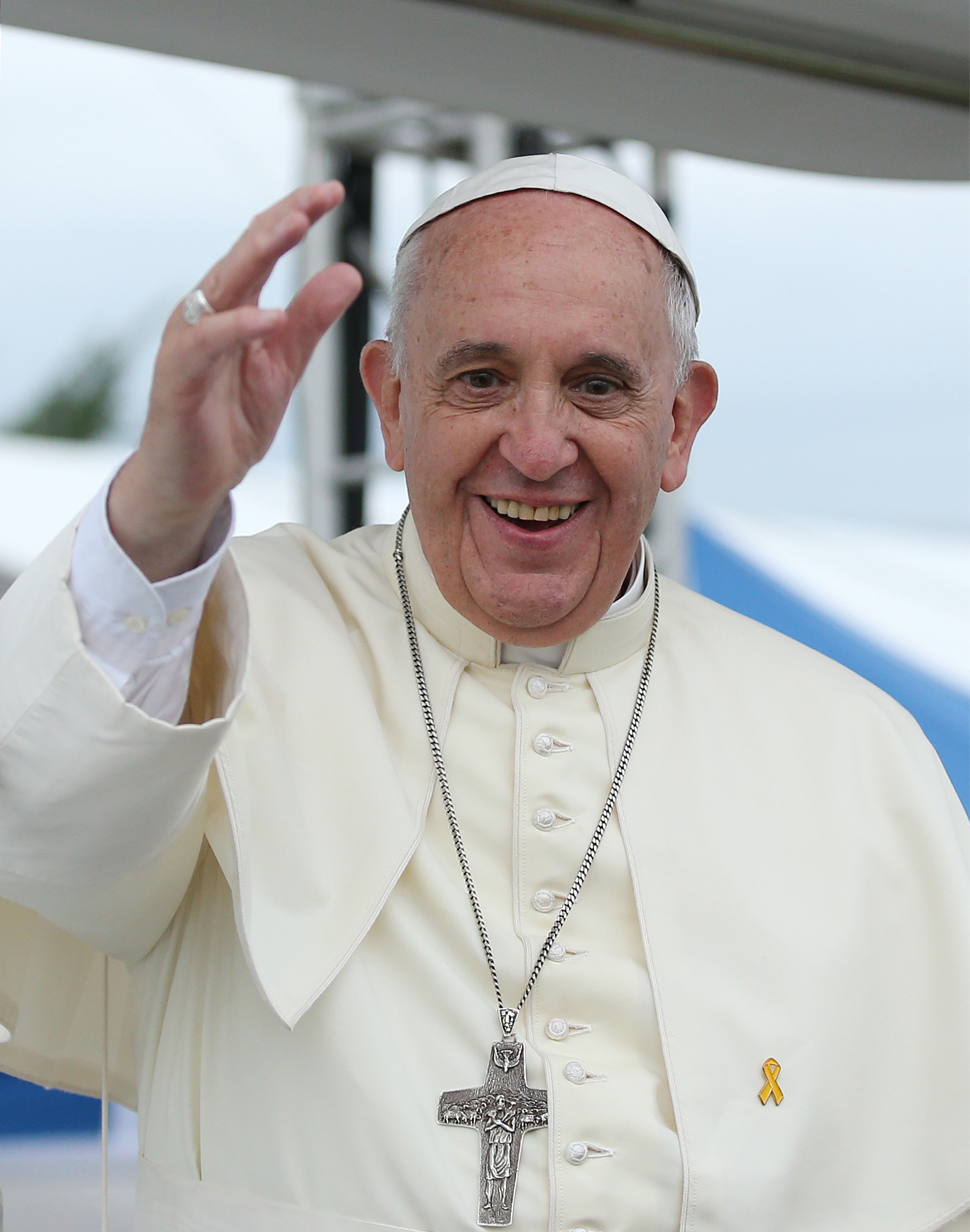
Pope Francis

- Pope Francis tried to mediate between the two countries, while strongly condemning "the diabolical senselessness of the violence." After inviting all the Catholic bishops and all the more than one billion Catholics to participate, Pope Francis consecrated Russia and Ukraine to the Immaculate Heart of Mary, in connection with a famous 1917 apparition of the Virgin Mary which asked for this consecration for the "conversion of Russia," so that "a period of peace" in the world will ensue. A communiqué from the Vatican Cardinal Secretary of State Pietro Parolin, without naming Putin, said that while the worst-case scenario was unfolding, "there is still time for goodwill, there is still room for negotiation, there is still room to exercise a wisdom that prevents partisan interests from prevailing, that protects the legitimate aspirations of all and spares the world the folly and horrors of war". The previous day Pope Francis urged politicians to make an exercise of conscience before God for their actions over Ukraine and declared 2 March, Ash Wednesday, as an international day of fasting and prayer for peace.
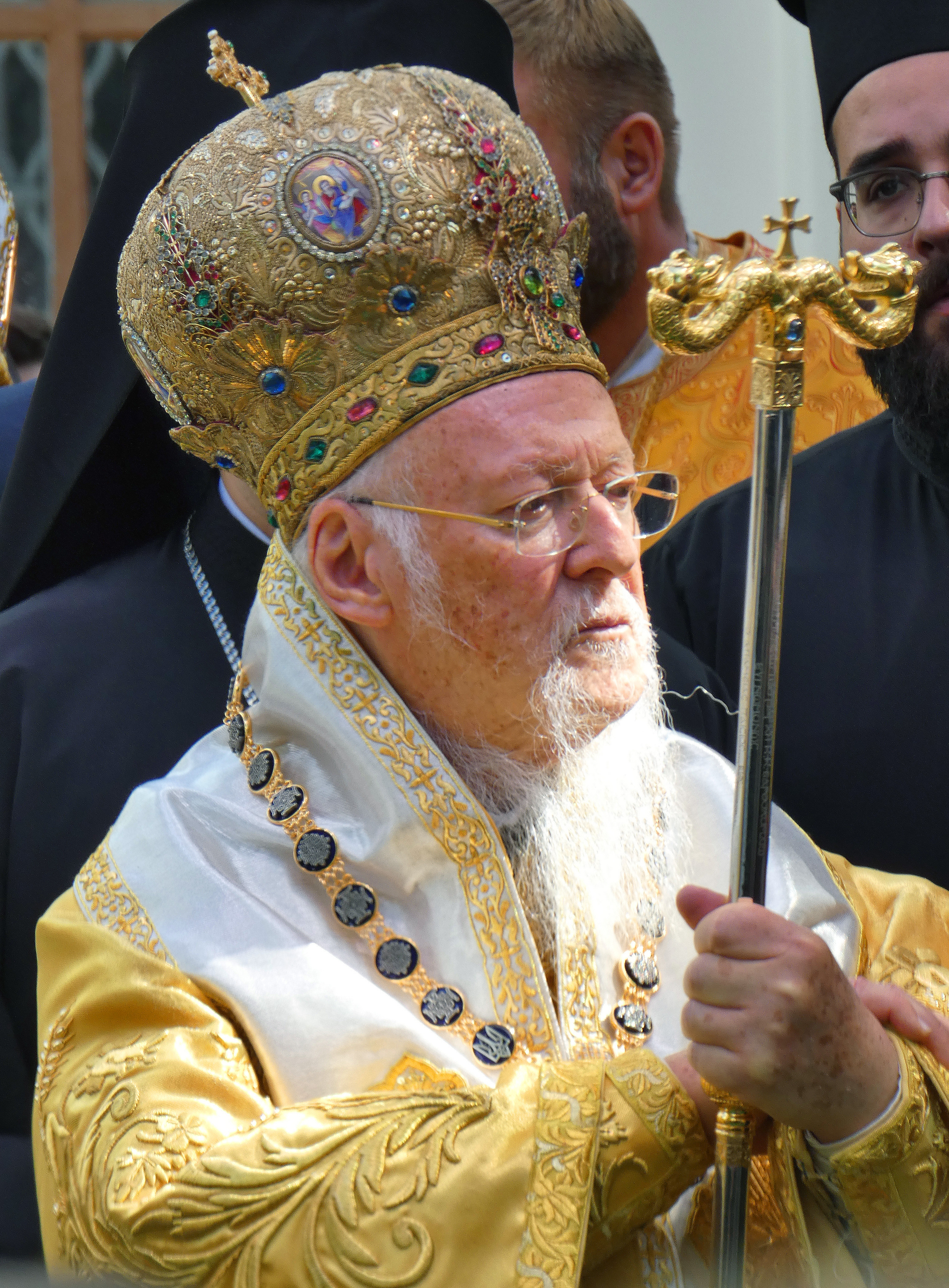
- Ecumenical Patriarch Bartholomew I in Kyiv in 2021
  The Ecumenical Patriarch Bartholomew I condemned the invasion, expressing deep sorrow, as well as his support for Ukraine, and stated that "he prays to the God of love and peace to enlighten the leadership of the Russian Federation, in order to understand the tragic consequences of its decisions".
- Kirill, Patriarch of Moscow and all Rus' (Russian Orthodox Church) expressed "heartfelt pain" at "events taking place" after Russia launched the attack, and called "on all parties to the conflict to do everything possible to avoid civilian casualties". He added that he "call[s] on all parties to the conflict to do everything possible to avoid civilian casualties" and asks the Moscow Patriarchate "to raise a deep and fervent prayer for the rapid restoration of peace". Kirill also appealed to the bishops, pastors, monastics, and laity to "provide all possible assistance to all victims, including refugees and people left homeless and without means of livelihood". He called for the "speedy restoration of peace". Three days later Patriarch Kirill also referred to Moscow's opponents in Ukraine as "evil forces", stating "we must not allow dark and hostile external forces to laugh at us." Those statements of Kirill on the invasion have been seen as pro-Putin and providing historical and religious justification to the war. Speaking during Orthodox Christmas in 2023, Putin praised the Russian Orthodox Church for its support of the Russian troops.
- Russia-born Metropolitan Innocent (Vasilyev) of Vilnius condemned "Russia's war against Ukraine" and is determined to seek greater independence from Moscow. He called Patriarch Kirill's "political statements about the war" his "personal opinion."
- Metropolitan Aleksandrs Kudrjašovs of Riga and all Latvia condemned the Russian invasion of Ukraine.
- Talgat Tadzhuddin, head of the Central Muslim Spiritual Directorate in Ufa, supported the invasion and blamed the Ukrainian government and "the Western world" for "trying to arrange a genocide [of the Russian people] and revive fascism."
- Metropolitan Yevgeny, primate of the Estonian Orthodox Church of the Moscow Patriarchate, signed a statement condemning Russia's invasion of Ukraine.
- In a joint statement, the Archbishop of Canterbury Justin Welby and the Archbishop of York Stephen Cottrell defined the invasion as a "great evil", calling for a public decision to choose the path to peace and an international conference to formulate agreements for long-term stability and peace while supporting the Pope's proposal for a global day of prayer and fasting for peace.
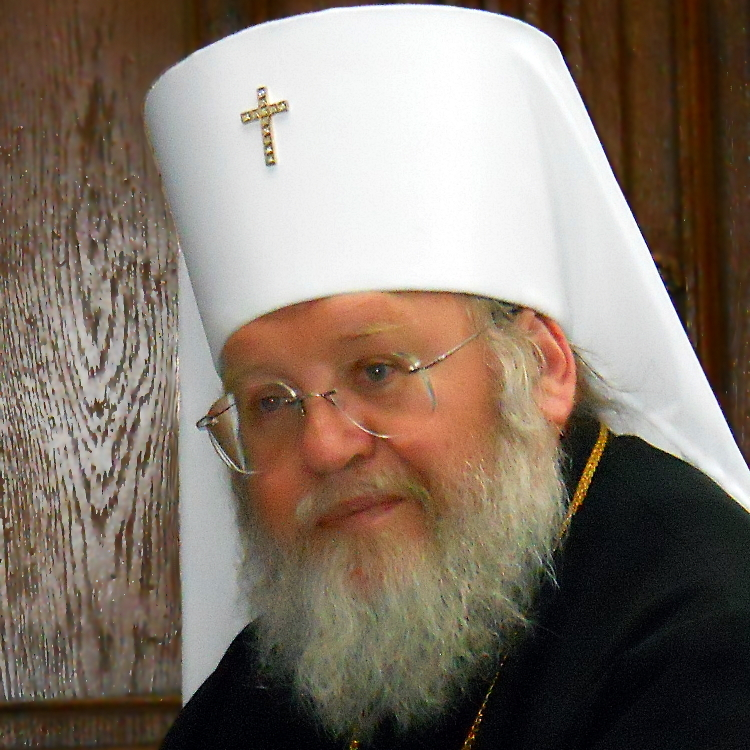
- Hilarion Kapral
  Metropolitan Hilarion Kapral, First Hierarch of the Russian Orthodox Church Outside Russia, issued a statement in which he did not acknowledge the war but invited the faithful to "refrain from excess watching of television, following newspapers or the internet" and "close their hearts to the passions ignited by the mass media." In the statement, he used the term the Ukrainian land instead of Ukraine, a move seen as a deliberate denial of Ukraine's independence and sovereignty. Hilarion has close ties to the Kremlin and to Vladimir Putin, from whom he was awarded the Order of Honour and the Order of Alexander Nevsky.
- Patriarch of Alexandria and All Africa Theodore II expressed his support for the Ukrainian people. He made it clear that the Patriarchate of Alexandria immediately condemned the Russian invasion of Ukraine.
- Patriarch of Serbian Orthodox Church Porfirije announced that the Serbian Orthodox Church ''will be sending help, to our brothers in Ukraine and that all donations in the temples that are collected these days will be sent to the Ukrainian Orthodox Church and its Metropolitan, who will help deliver them where needed''. It was noted that he excluded the Orthodox Church of Ukraine and its Metropolitan Epiphanius of Kyiv, as well as he had avoided mentioning the Russian involvement in the crisis.
- Patriarch of Georgian Orthodox Church Ilia II appealed for an end to the hostilities in Ukraine. In his Twitter message, Ilia stated: "The hostilities in Ukraine must be stopped as soon as possible; otherwise, they will develop into a world tragedy!" On 26 February, the Patriarchate of Georgia published another letter, in which Ilia addressed the clergy and the people of the country, and invited them to daily prayer for Ukraine.
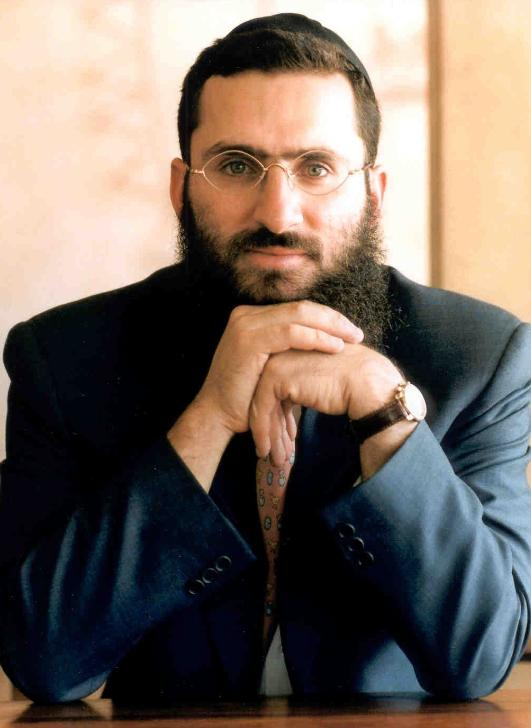
- Rabbi Shmuley Boteach
  Russian Chief Rabbi Berel Lazar spoke out against the invasion, called Russia to withdraw and for an end to the war, and offered to mediate. American Rabbi Shmuley Boteach wrote an article in The Jerusalem Post with the sub-heading: "Vladimir Putin is important to world Jewry, but this does not change the fact that the Russian president is a monster."
- The umbrella organizations Eurodiaconia and the European Humanist Federation issued statements condemning the invasion and calling for peace.
- The spokesperson of the Patriarch of All Romania (Romanian Orthodox Church) Vasile Bănescu harshly criticized Putin and Patriarch Kirill, referring to them as "an opulent resigning patriarch from a moral and Christian point of view through his cynical complicity with the assassin politician and through his association with the most hideous things that the antichrist man, who mimics faith in God and patriotism, is capable of committing with atrocities". He also described the war as "terrible" and "unjust" and against "the life of a free people," and declared that "even when the devil deceives the reality before us, we always have a duty to discern and confess the truth".

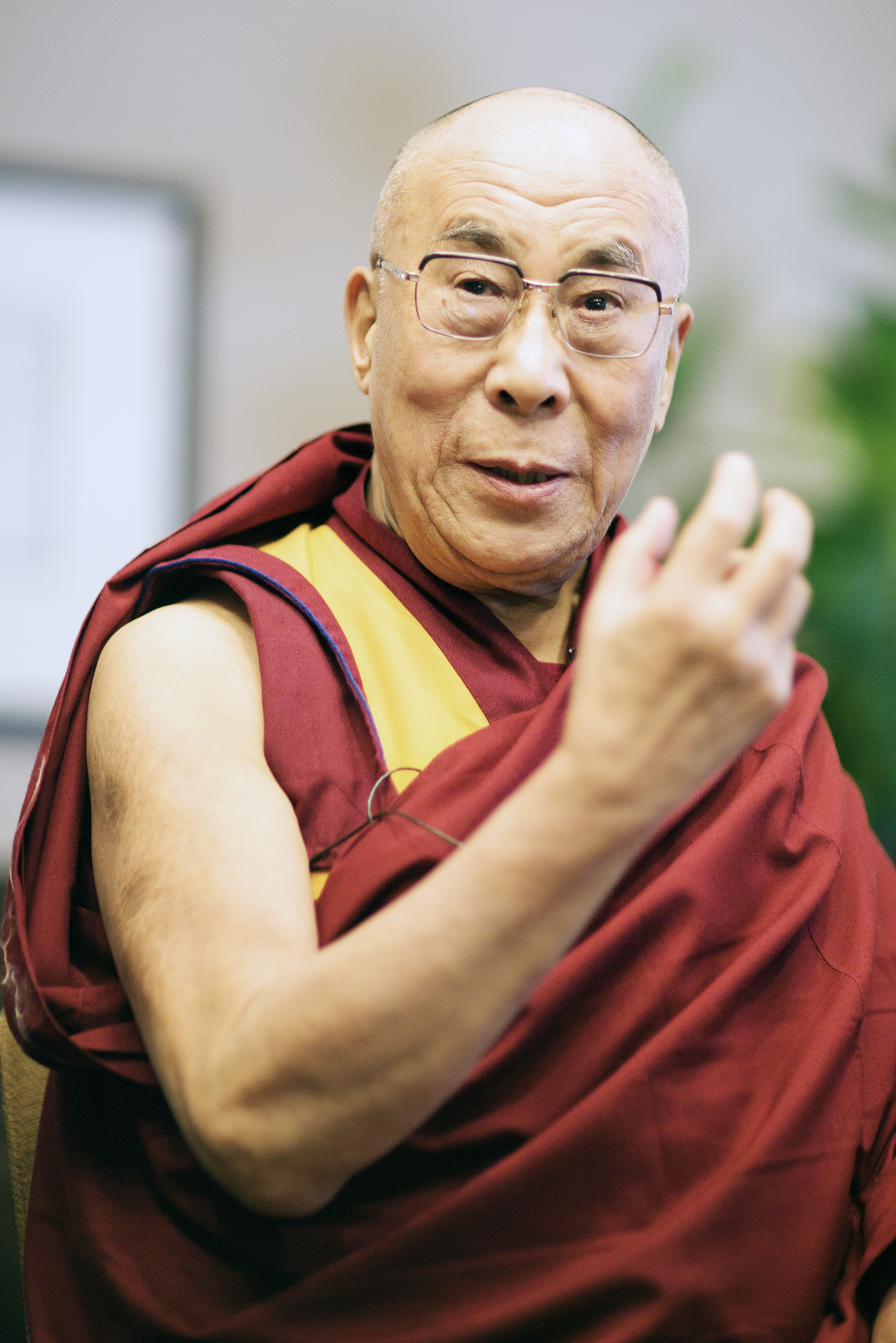
The Dalai Lama

- The Dalai Lama condemned the invasion and called for peace talks between Russia and Ukraine.
- A Russian Orthodox Church in Amsterdam, announced it is to split with the Moscow patriarchate over Russia's invasion of Ukraine.
- Both Russia and Ukraine representatives in Indonesia visited the headquarter of Nadhlatul Ulama, the largest Islamic mass organization in the world, in Jakarta to gain support from the organization in order to obtain religious support and attempted to indirectly influence Indonesian president Joko Widodo to take side in March 2022 as Nadhlatul Ulama is Joko Widodo's ally. In response, the organization issued statements calling to ceasefire and immediately stopping the war. The organization also stated to not support any side and maintain neutrality.
- The World Council of Churches issued a statement in September 2022 condemning the war against Ukraine as "illegal and unjustifiable" and strongly criticized the use of religious language to support the war.
- The day after the invasion began, The Church of Jesus Christ of Latter-day Saints said that it would "pray that this armed conflict will end quickly" and "that the controversies will end peacefully," but did not directly refer to either Ukraine or Russia in the statement.

=== Hacking groups ===
==== Anonymous ====
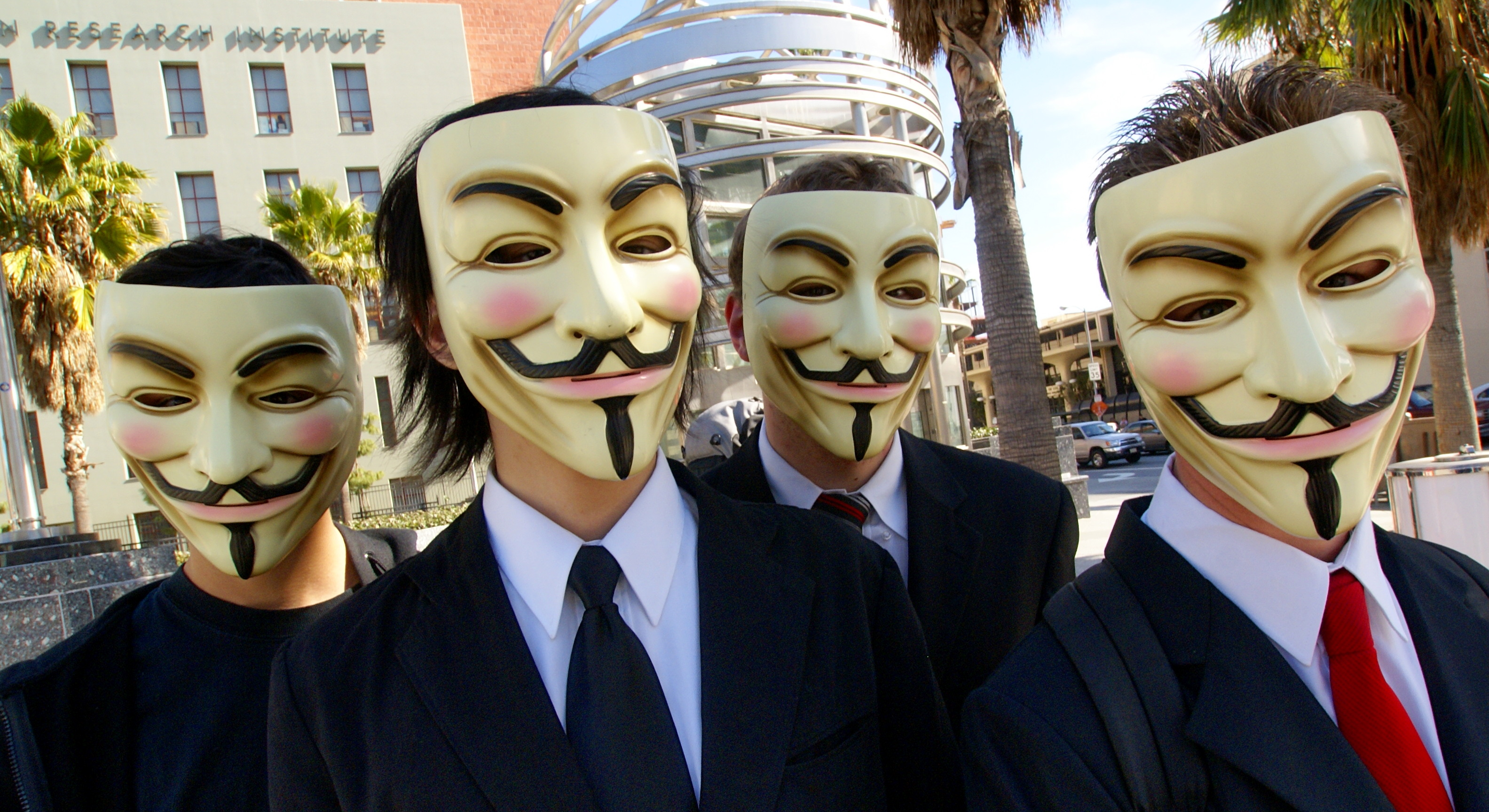
Anonymous

- The hacking group Anonymous condemned the invasion; the group tweeted on 24 February that it is "currently involved in operations against the Russian Federation", and declared on Twitter less than an hour later that it was "officially in cyber war against the Russian government". The group later, in its set of two tweets, claimed "while people around the globe smash your internet providers to bits, understand that it's entirely directed at the actions of the Russian government and Putin". Furthermore, they had hacked several Russian websites and industrial control systems such as Modbus devices and emphasized that "Anonymous is not a group, not a country, but an amorphous idea. It flows like air, like water, like everything. Let it be known that since its inception, Anonymous never have restrictions that say that only homo sapiens can be part of it."
- In a defaced Russian website, Anonymous threatened that any further cyber attacks will be "precipitated by Russia's continued failure in recognizing the territorial aggression in itself is nothing but a relic of dark ages in the distant past".
- On 26 February 2022, several accounts on Twitter claiming to be affiliated with Anonymous stated the group hacked and took down the Kremlin's official websites in a series of cyber attacks. Some of the websites hit by the attacks included the Russian Center for the Protection of Monuments, which was turned into a rogue page which included Ukrainian colors and the pop-up message: "We Are Anonymous! We Are Legion! We Do Not Forgive! We Do Not Forget! Expect Us!" On such page, Anonymous claimed to have hacked a Russian Linux terminal and a gas control system in North Ossetia, almost succeeding in causing an explosion in the latter. Anonymous stated that by changing the dates, the gas pressure almost caused an explosion (which the group phrased as "turning into fireworks"), but did not because of a fast-acting human worker at the gas control system. The page, which has been archived on the Internet Archive, contained a long line of text in English and Russian proposing a neutral security belt composed of Ukraine, Finland, and Georgia, among other countries, as well as YouTube videos of President Zelenskyy, screenshots of the gas controller during the hack, clips from the ending of the movie The Matrix, a video message from Anonymous itself mirroring some of the details posted to the website, and the "WE ARE ANONYMOUS" pop-up message repeated. The Russian government denied it was hacked by the group.
- That same day, RT was attacked by Anonymous by a distributed denial-of-service attack involving over 100 million mostly American devices. RT acknowledged the attack, unlike the Kremlin, and stated that the attack occurred after Anonymous "declared war" on Russia.
- Anonymous is also believed to be responsible for hacking several Russian state TV channels; many users on Twitter and TikTok uploaded videos showing channels playing Ukrainian music and displaying pro-Ukraine images, flags, and symbols.
- In the aftermath of Bucha massacre, the hacking collective leaked the personal information of 120,000 Russian soldiers in Ukraine.
- Anonymous leaked 446 GB of data from the Russian Ministry of Culture.
- Network Battalion 65 (NB65), a hacktivist group affiliated with Anonymous, has reportedly hacked Russian payment processor Qiwi. A total of 10.5 terabytes of data including transaction records and customers' credit cards had been exfiltrated. They further infected Qiwi with ransomwares and threatened to release more customer records.
- On July 18, 2023, Taiwan News reported that Anonymous inserted Taiwanese flag, photo of Tsai Ing-wen along with the flag of fictional "Belgorod People's Republic" on two United Nations websites, specifically that of UN's High-Level Political Forum on Sustainable Development (HLPF) and the UN Academy websites. There they protested Google's policy of deleting inactive accounts, stating that it is "harsh" and "destroys history". Furthermore, they uploaded a text file disputing space exploration claims by the Soviet Union and a PDF version of a paper titled "Wikipedia's Intentional Distortion of the History of the Holocaust," by professors Jan Grabowski and Shira Klein. On the UN academy website, a pixilated version of Taiwan's national flag and the lyrics of the Taiwanese national anthem are shown. Anonymous further threatened Russia against using tactical nuclear weapons in Ukraine or jeopardizing the safety of the Zaporizhzhia Nuclear Power Plant, remarking that the collective possessed the "ultimate ace card", without revealing what it is other than to say that it is a "trick rather than a treat."

=== Culture ===
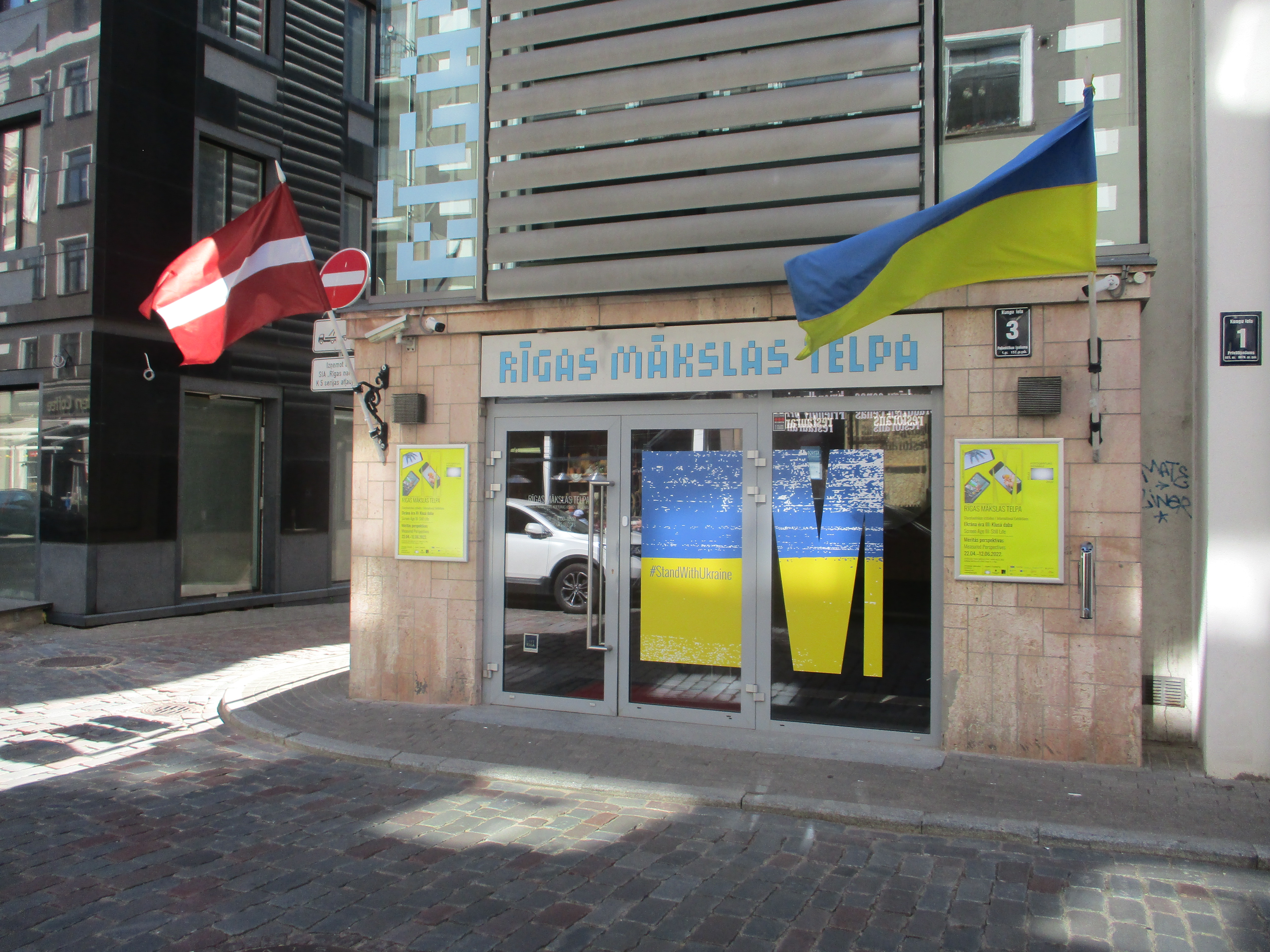
Riga Art Space in colours of the Ukrainian flag.

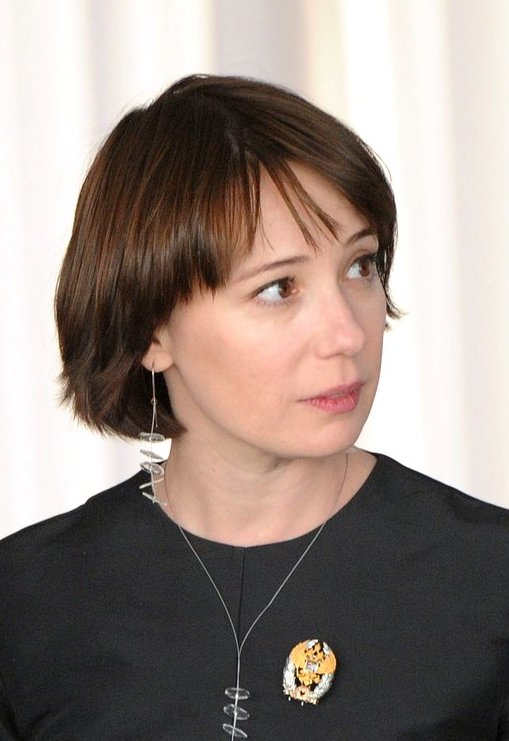
Russian actress Chulpan Khamatova, known for her roles in Good Bye, Lenin! and Petrov's Flu, left Russia after signing an anti-war petition

- Cultural heritage organization Europa Nostra, the European Association of Archaeologists, the European Union National Institutes for Culture, J. Paul Getty Museum and the Network of European Museum Organisations also issued statements condemning the invasion and calling for peace.
- Plans to import coal from Russia for various steam heritage railways in Great Britain, including the Talyllyn Railway and North Yorkshire Moors Railway have been scrapped in favour of coal from Kazakhstan, Colombia and Poland.
- Danish artist Jens Galschiøt and Amnesty International Denmark erected the sculpture Pillar of Shame on the City Hall Square in Copenhagen on 24 March, a month since the start of the Russian invasion of Ukraine.
- The Cannes Film Festival declined press accreditation to Russian journalists associated with outlets who are not aligned with the festival's anti-war position.
- The Hermitage Amsterdam broke its ties with the Russian Hermitage, renaming itself H'ART Museum.

==== Broadcast media ====
- The European Broadcasting Union (EBU) initially stated that Russia would still be allowed to compete in the Eurovision Song Contest 2022, but that it would "continue to monitor the situation closely." However, on 25 February, following complaints levied by other participating countries, the EBU announced that Russia would not be allowed to compete in the contest, stating that "the inclusion of a Russian entry in this year's Contest would bring the competition into disrepute."
- American actor/director Sean Penn traveled to Ukraine to filming a documentary about the ongoing Russian invasion of Ukraine. On 25 February 2022, Penn stated that "If we allow it [Ukraine] to fight alone, our soul as America is lost."
- American sketch comedy show Saturday Night Live opted to forgo the show's usual comedic cold open; instead, cast members Kate McKinnon and Cecily Strong introduced the Ukrainian Chorus Dumka of New York, who performed "Prayer for Ukraine". The cold open ended with McKinnon and Strong solemnly saying the show's opening catchphrase behind a table with candles spelling out "Kyiv". This was only the sixth time the show has broken format for the cold open in light of recent events, after the 11 September attacks in 2001, the Sandy Hook Elementary School shooting in 2012, the November 2015 Paris attacks, Donald Trump's victory in the 2016 United States presidential election, and the 2017 Las Vegas shootings.
- Annual Glasgow Film Festival pulled two Russian movies, No Looking Back directed by Kirill Sokolov and The Execution directed by Lado Kvataniya from the festival, stating that "it would be inappropriate to proceed as normal with these screenings in the current circumstances". The organizing committee stated that film tickets would be refunded for those who had bought tickets.
- The Simpsons' official Twitter account posted a photo of main characters Homer, Marge, Bart, Lisa, and Maggie all holding or donning Ukrainian flags. Showrunner Al Jean commented "We don't do this very often, only very rarely when there's something ... extremely important for a cause that could not be bigger."
- At the initiative of Patricia Schlesinger (RBB/ARD) and the European Broadcasting Union (EBU), more than 200 German radio stations and more than 150 public radio broadcasters from 25 European countries simultaneously aired John Lennon and Yoko Ono's anti-war song "Give Peace a Chance" at 8:45 CET on 4 March. The song was furthermore performed by the Rockin'1000 for the opening of the final of the Eurovision Song Contest 2022, another EBU event.

==== Dance ====
- The Royal Opera House in London canceled a planned summer tour by Moscow's Bolshoi Ballet.
- Choreographer Alexei Ratmansky, who was raised in Kyiv, postponed the world premiere of Art of the Fugue, originally scheduled for 30 March at the Bolshoi Ballet, indefinitely. He also said he will not return to St. Petersburg to complete his production of The Pharaoh's Daughter for the Mariinsky Ballet, which planned to premiere the production in mid-May. He stated he will not return to Russia if Putin is still president.
- French ballet master Laurent Hilaire, the director of dance at Stanislavski and Nemirovich-Danchenko Theatre, resigned over the invasion.
- Russian ballerina Olga Smirnova denounced the invasion and stated that she was ashamed of Russia. She then left her position as principal dancer of Bolshoi Ballet and joined the Dutch National Ballet. She had already planned to leave Bolshoi but accelerated the move due to the invasion.
- Several foreign dancers at Bolshoi and Mariinsky, including Xander Parish, Jacopo Tissi and David Motta Soares, left Russia.
- The George Balanchine Trust "paused all future licensing conversations" with Russian ballet companies regarding the choreographer's works.
- Choreographer Jean-Christophe Maillot requested the Bolshoi Ballet to suspend performances of his The Taming of the Shrew, though Bolshoi general director Vladimir Urin refused to do so.
- On 4 April, Russian Igor Zelensky resigned as artistic director of the Bavarian State Ballet for "private family reasons", after he failed to condemn the invasion, and was summoned by the German Science and Arts Ministry to explain his links to a cultural heritage foundation tied with the Russian state. Serge Dorny, the general director of Bavarian State Opera, had inadvertently told Russian pranksters Vovan and Lexus that Zelensky "didn't make that decision on his own", and said, "We had a conversation, and I brought him to this conclusion." In May, a joint investigation by Der Spiegel and Russian independent publication iStories alleged that Zelensky is in a relationship with Putin's daughter Katerina Tikhonova, and is the father of her daughter. Laurent Hilaire was appointed as Zelensky's successor at the Bavarian State Ballet.

==== Lighting of landmarks ====
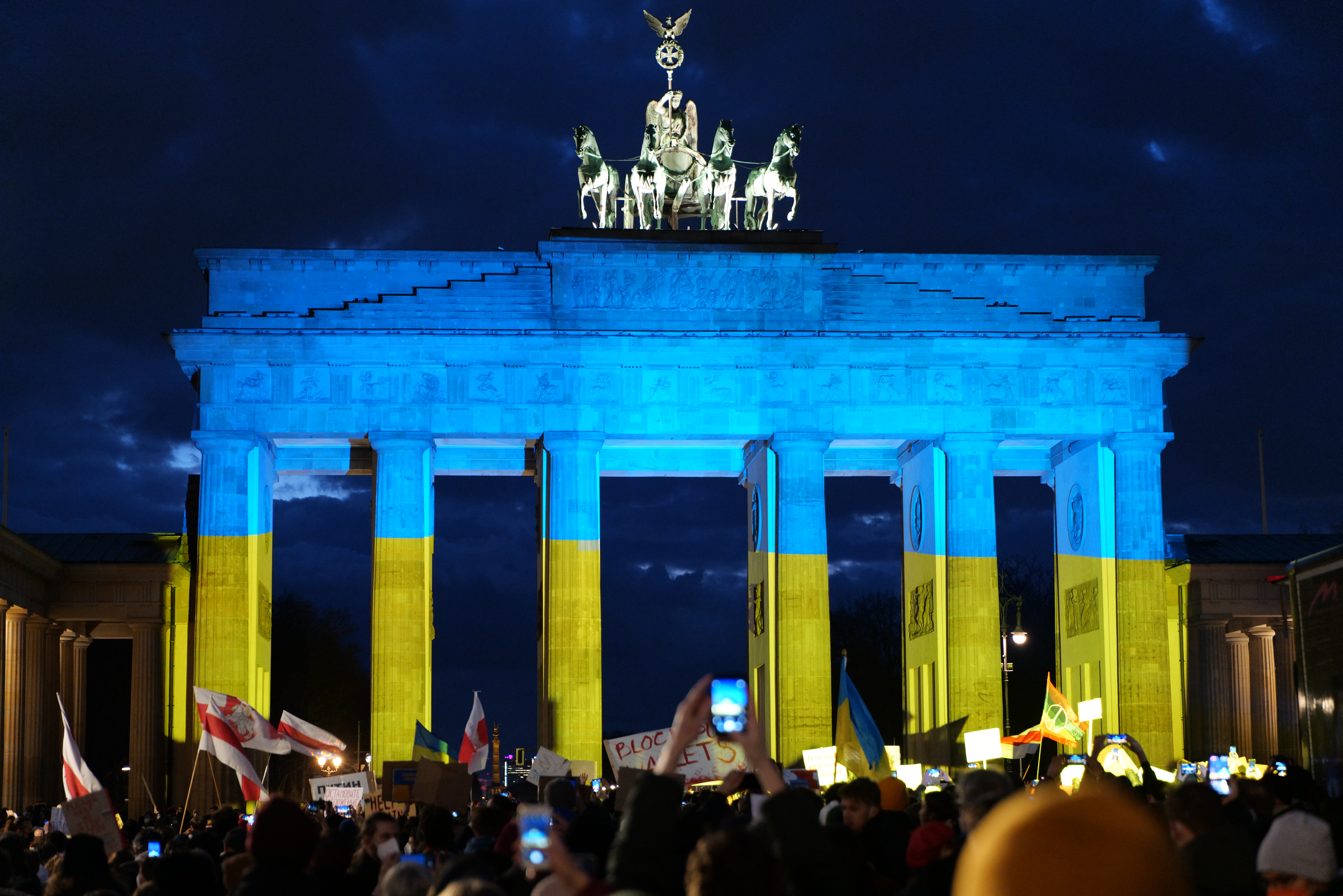
The Brandenburg Gate lit up in the colours of the Ukrainian flag during a solidarity protest in Berlin, Germany, on 24 February 2022

The landmarks lit up in the colours of the Ukrainian flag included: the Empire State Building, the New York State Assembly, the Pennsylvania State Capitol, the Missouri State Capitol, the Niagara Falls, CN Tower, 3D Toronto sign, downtown Dallas skyline including Reunion Tower and Omni Dallas Hotel, Calgary Tower, the Memorial Bridge, the Frederick Douglass Memorial Bridge, the Acosta Bridge, the Zakim Bridge, the Terminal Tower, the Obelisco de Buenos Aires, the London Eye, the Eiffel Tower, the Colosseum, Brandenburg Gate, the Fisherman's Bastion, the Palazzo Marino, Cybele Palace, Nelson's Column, the Ludwigsburg Palace, the Øresund Bridge, the Tbilisi TV Broadcasting Tower, St Andrew's House, Wembley Stadium, the Crown Buildings, the Senedd building, the SIS Building, 10 Downing Street, St George's Hall, the Royal National Theatre, Ely Cathedral, Blackpool Tower, Somerset House, the Oxo Tower, Bratislava Castle, Grassalkovich Palace, Petřín Lookout Tower, Sarajevo City Hall, the Mole Antonelliana, the Belém Palace, Stenbock House, Palace of Culture and Science, Cotroceni Palace, Vukovar water tower, Tokyo Metropolitan Government Building, Sebitseom, the N Seoul Tower, Taipei 101, Kaohsiung Music Center, numerous landmarks in Melbourne including Flinders Train Station, the Sydney Opera House, as well as ministries of foreign affairs in the Czech Republic, Denmark, Estonia, and the United Kingdom.

==== Music ====
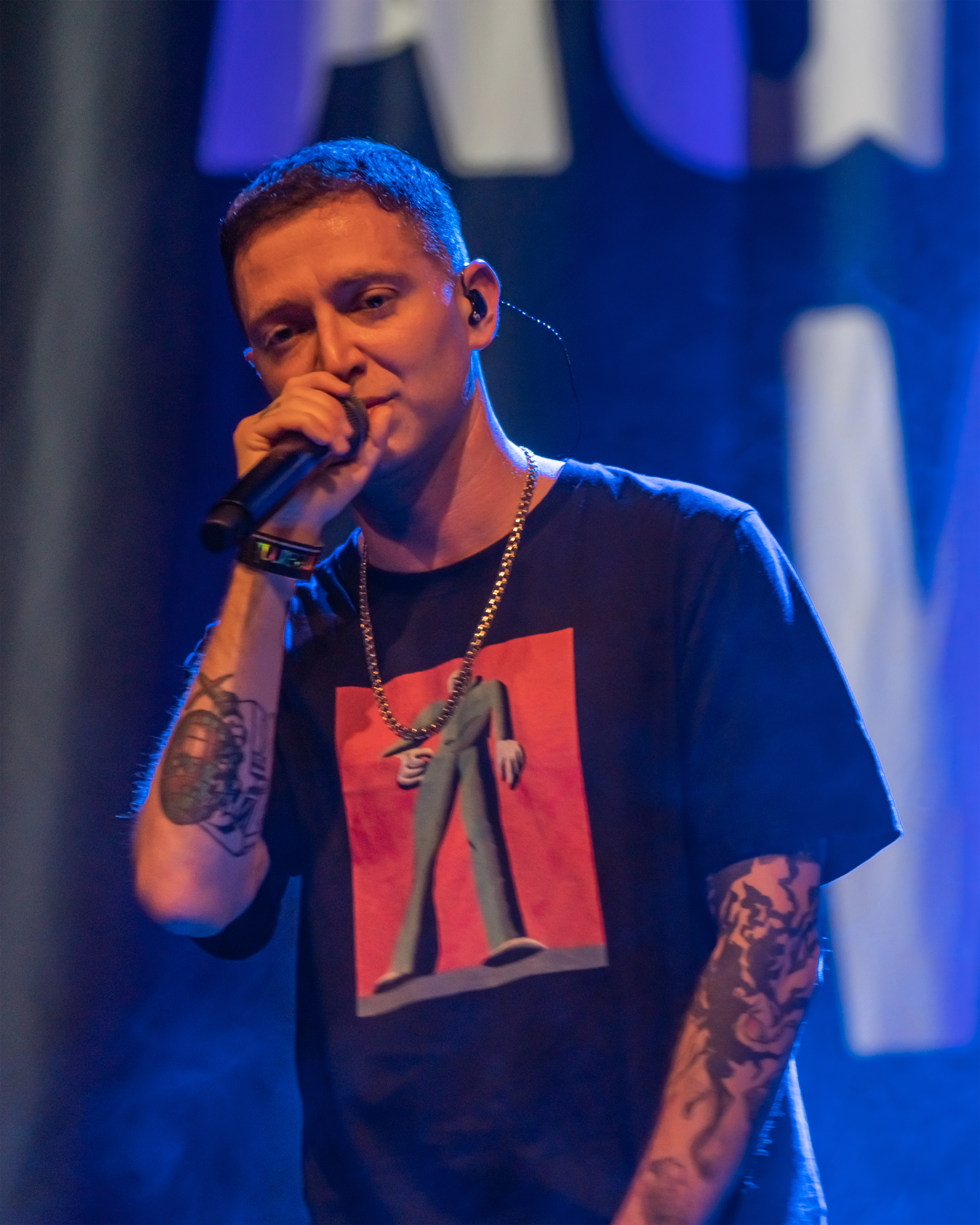
Russian rapper Oxxxymiron announced a series of anti-war concerts to raise money for Ukrainian refugees.

- Russian rapper Oxxxymiron announced he would cancel six concerts in Moscow and St. Petersburg in response to the invasion. He later said that it was impossible to hold an anti-war concert in Russia because "total censorship has been implemented, and anyone who speaks out against the war in any way becomes a potential target for criminal prosecution."
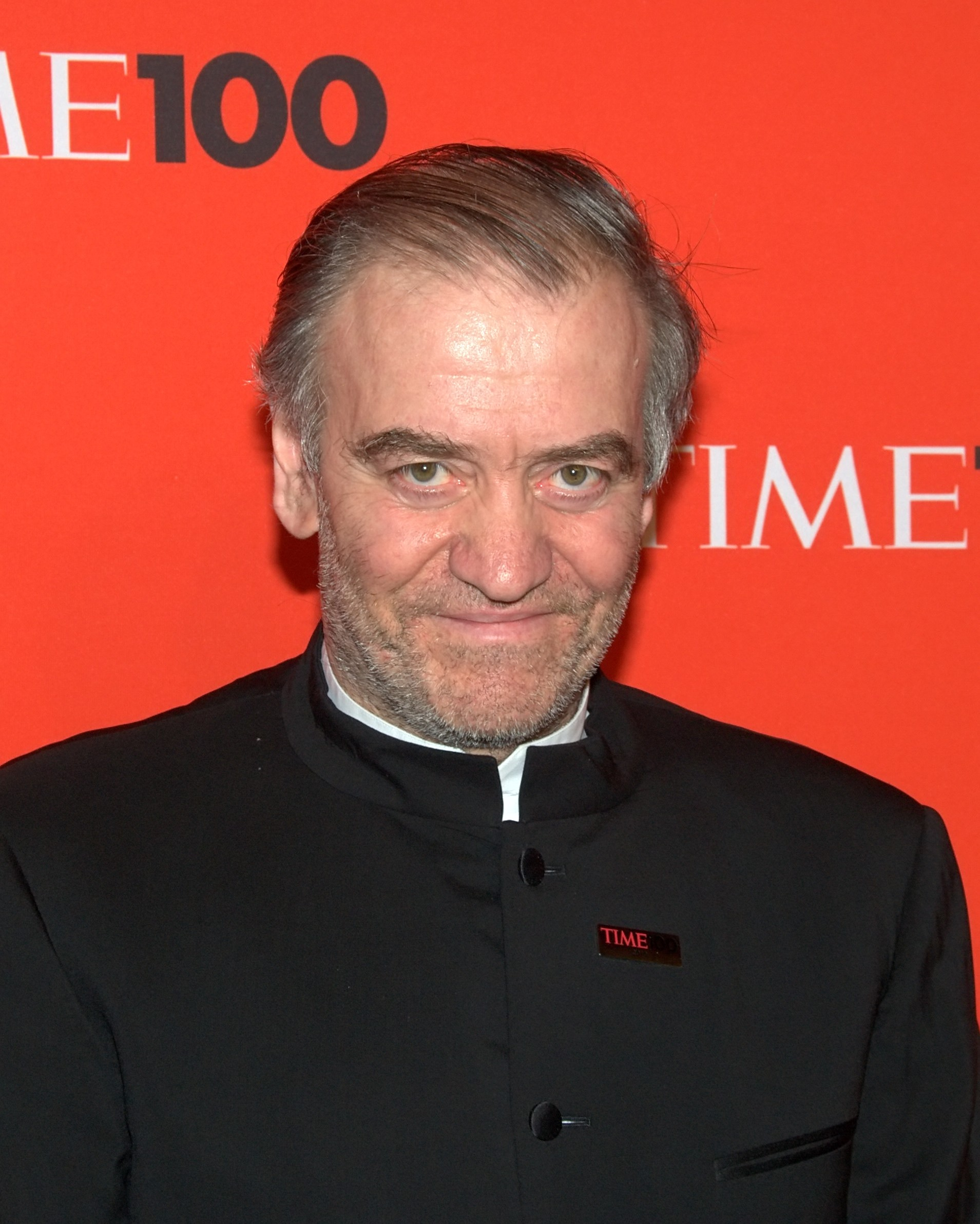
- Valery Gergiev
  Mayor of Munich Dieter Reiter stated on 25 February that he would remove Valery Gergiev as conductor of the Munich Philharmonic unless Gergiev publicly condemned the Russian invasion before 28 February. Gergiev has previously been vocal in support of Russian President Putin. Similarly, the Rotterdam Philharmonic Orchestra said that it would drop Gergiev from its September festival if he did not stop supporting Putin. Milan's La Scala also sent a letter to Gergiev asking him to declare his support for a peaceful resolution in Ukraine or he would not be permitted to complete his engagement conducting Tchaikovsky's The Queen of Spades. This followed an announcement by New York City's Carnegie Hall that it had canceled two May performances by the Mariinsky Theatre Orchestra that were to be conducted by Gergiev and the Vienna Philharmonic dropped Gergiev from a five-concert tour in the U.S. that was to start on 25 February. Gergiev did not comply with the ultimatum from the mayor of Munich, who dismissed him on 1 March.
- Green Day announced on 27 February that they were canceling the Moscow concert scheduled for 29 May on the grounds that "we are aware that this moment is not about stadium rock shows, it's much bigger than that."
- Russian Semyon Bychkov, music director of the Czech Philharmonic, issued a statement critical of Putin.
- The Chicago Symphony Orchestra and Berlin Philharmonic dedicated performances in light of the invasion.
- The Cardiff Philharmonic Orchestra, who planned to perform a few of Tchaikovsky's pieces on 18 March, changed its schedule to perform works by John Williams, Dvorak and Elgar, saying in a statement that it would be "inappropriate at this time" to perform Tchaikovsky's music at this period, and also noting that some of Tchaikovsky's pieces are deemed offensive to Ukrainians. They however have no plans to change their summer and autumn programmes which include pieces by other Russian composers such as Rachmaninoff, Prokofiev and Rimsky-Korsakov.
- English indie rock band alt-J cancelled all their gigs in Russia scheduled to be held in the summer and called on Putin to end the war.
- Ukrainian metalcore band Jinjer cancelled their spring North American tour in order to focus on relief efforts. On 4 March, the band announced two exclusive t-shirt designs. Proceeds from these sales would support Ukrainian charitable organizations.
- English singer and rock band Sir Elton John and Deep Purple separately announced that they will never perform in Russia ever again. Deep Purple also has cancelled two concert in Megasport Sport Palace, Moscow and Palace of Sports, Kyiv scheduled on 31 May and 4 June. In addition, English heavy metal band Iron Maiden has also cancelled their tour in Russia and Ukraine scheduled on 29 May and 1 June.
- English rock band Pink Floyd removed music from streaming platforms in Russia and Belarus.
- Vancouver Recital Society has cancelled the performance of Russian pianist Alexander Malofeev that was scheduled to perform in August. However, Vancouver Recital Society artistic director Leila Getz said that the concert was simply "postponed" instead of cancelled. Malofeev himself later stated that "every Russian will feel guilty for decades because of the terrible and bloody decision that none of us could influence and predict." on his Facebook page.
- Canadian rock band Sum 41 cancelled their performance in a music festivals in both Russia and Ukraine.
- Numerous jazz musicians united to held a concert as form of solidarity with Ukraine scheduled to be held on 13 March in Cockpit Theatre, Marylebone, London.
- Russian soprano Anna Netrebko withdrew from future performances with the Metropolitan Opera. Netrebko stated that she opposed the "senseless war of aggression" but stated that she will not renounce her support for President Putin. On 14 March 2022, the Metropolitan Opera hosted a benefit concert with all proceeds going to relief efforts in Ukraine, with Sergiy Kyslytsya, the Permanent Representative of Ukraine to the United Nations in attendance. The concert was opened with the State Anthem of Ukraine, sung by the Ukrainian soloist Vladyslav Buialskyi.
- UK television channels ITV and STV broadcast a charity concert called Concert for Ukraine on 29 March 2022 with proceeds going to the Disasters Emergency Committee. ITV said within less than one day of the broadcast, the concert raised more than £13.4 million.
- On 2 April, it was reported that Swedish singer Carola Häggkvist was inside Ukraine, helping a charity at the Ukraine-Poland border, by handing out warm soup to refugees.
- Numerous artists who represented Ukraine in the Eurovision Song Contest, including winners Ruslana and Jamala, appealed for help. Jamala, who fled the country due to the war and eventually took refuge in Turkey, raised more than €90,000,000 from performing at various benefit concerts. Ruslana appealed to Elon Musk for help via her YouTube channel. Tina Karol spoke out against the invasion on social media, and Andriy Danylko, better known as his drag persona Verka Serduchka, posted his condemnation of the invasion on social media as well. Go_A performed their song "Shum", with which they represented Ukraine in the Eurovision Song Contest 2021, during the Dutch Liberation Day festivities on 5 May.
- On 7 July, the San Diego Symphony announced, "following the lead of many orchestras across the globe", that it would not be performing Tchaikovsky's 1812 Overture during the season ending performance as they have every year since 1998, because it was commissioned to commemorate Russia's victory over Napoleon's army.

==== Social media ====
- The phrase "World War III" and hashtag "#WWIII" trended on Twitter as the invasion began, due to fears the conflict could draw in NATO members into a larger war with Russia, as well as memes joking about the situation. The phrase had previously trended after the assassination of Qasem Soleimani in January 2020 sparked fears of a potential war between the United States and Iran.

==== Video games ====
- 11 Bit Studios, a Polish video game company and creators of the 2014 war survival video game This War of Mine, announced on 24 February 2022 that in responsive to the invasion, all money raised from sales of the game from 24 February 2022 to 3 March 2022 will be donated to the Ukrainian Red Cross to directly help victims of the invasion.
- GSC Game World, a Ukrainian game company and the creators of the S.T.A.L.K.E.R. series, made a tweet urging fans and game journalists to donate to the Ukrainian Armed Forces and provided a special account that would handle donations. They also stated that the development of S.T.A.L.K.E.R. 2: Heart of Chornobyl would be delayed to allow for staff to be safe during the invasion.
- Frogwares, a Ukrainian-based studio, on Twitter stated that they will not tolerate the aggression on their Homeland where the studio is located.
- Vostok Games, a Ukrainian studio, tweeted a Ukrainian flag and hashtag "#StandWithUkraine" on the day of invasion.
- The Farm 51, another Polish game company, made a tweet that included links to Polish Humanitarian Action and the Ukrainian Red Cross in solidarity.
- Ubisoft released a Twitter statement on 26 February stating "all of our hearts are with our teams and their loved ones in Ukraine". The company, which operates development studios in Kyiv and Odesa, provided its Ukrainian workforce with additional funds, paid salaries in advance to accounts that may be subject to disrupted banking systems, and encouraged its Ukrainian workforce to either take shelter or relocate. Ubisoft also pledged €200,000 to Save the Children and the Ukrainian Red Cross. On 7 March, Ubisoft stated that they will temporarily suspend all sales in Russia. "Digital and physical sales are suspended in Russia," a company spokesperson told Reuters in a call, confirming an earlier Bloomberg report.
- Bungie tweeted their solidarity on 25 February 2022 and pledged monetary support to Ukraine and its people. They stated that they will donate 100% of the proceeds of the first 48 hours of the Game2Give drive to humanitarian aid efforts. CEO of Bungie, Pete Parsons, independently have came out with solidarity to Ukraine. On 10 March, Bungie also announced that they will halt selling Destiny 2 content in Russia. The studio also donated $120,000 to two charities supporting humanitarian aid efforts in Ukraine.
- Raw Fury tweeted on 25 February 2022 their statement. They expressed their solidarity and vowed to donate to Ukrainian Red Cross in support of victims of war.
- CD Projekt Red, a Polish game studio known for The Witcher game franchise and Cyberpunk 2077, tweeted on 25 February 2022 that they will stand in solidarity with Ukrainian people and that they will donate 1 million PLN to Polska Akcja Humanitarna (PAH), Poland-based humanitarian organization. On 3 March, CD Projekt have announced that they will suspend sales of digital and physical stock deliveries of CD Projekt Group products, as well as games distributed on the GOG to Russia and Belarus.
- Techland, also a Polish game studio, known for Dying Light games, have tweeted a similar statement as CD Projekt Red on 26 February 2022 that they have been left devastated and heartbroken due to events in Ukraine. in supporting their neighbors from Ukraine by donating 1 million PLN to PAH.
- SCS Software on 28 February 2022 released a statement that they stand in solidarity with Ukraine and will give monetary support in the form of releasing DLC packages with Ukrainian color schemes and donating 100% of revenue to Ukraine. The studio also stated that they are in touch with charities and already donated €20,000.
- The war broke out when the Intel Extreme Masters Season XVI in Katowice was taking place. Ukrainian player S1mple made a speech and called for peace. Many e-sports organizations have also expressed support for Ukraine.
- Avalanche Studios Group put out statement on their Twitter account on 2 March 2022. They strongly condemned Russian invasion of Ukraine and announced that will be donating to Humanitarian efforts to alleviate people's sufferings.
- Wargaming, a game developer headquartered in Nicosia with studios in Minsk, Saint Petersburg and Kyiv, fired its creative director, Sergey Burkatovskiy, after he expressed support for the Russian invasion of Ukraine; the company issued the statement that "Sergey is an employee of the company and expressed his personal opinion, which categorically does not coincide with the position of the company. All our staff are now focused on helping our over 550 colleagues from Kyiv and their families... Sergei's opinion is in complete contradiction with the company's position. He is no longer an employee of Wargaming." Wargaming Kyiv also announced a 30 million hryvina (US$1 million) donation to the Ukrainian Red Cross. On April 4, Wargaming has announced their decision on their official Website to leave Russia and Belarus "The company has decided it will not own or operate any businesses in Russia and Belarus and will leave both countries." Wargaming had big presence within Russia and Belarus previously "Effective March 31 the company transferred its live games business in Russia and Belarus to local management of Lesta Studio that is no longer affiliated with Wargaming. The company will not profit from this process either today or going forward. Much to the contrary we expect to suffer substantial losses as a direct result of this decision."
- Digital Extremes, the developer and publisher of multiplayer game Warframe, posted their statement regarding on Ukrainian situation on their official website and Twitter. "Digital Extremes stands united and in solidarity with the people of Ukraine, upon whom unconscionable violence has been wrought." said Digital Extremes. "Last week, in an effort to assist the people of Ukraine and help ease their burdens during this time of crisis, we donated $100,000 CAD to the Canadian Red Cross to directly support relief efforts." Additionally they said they will suspend all kinds of sales in Russia and Belarus including in-game currency, bundles and cosmetics.
- Humble Bundle, a digital storefront for video games, announced that they will suspend sales in Russia and Belarus and will launch a Ukraine support bundle. "Like many in the world, we condemn the violent and unlawful invasion in Ukraine and the humanitarian crisis it is causing." The statement was posted on their Twitter page and they also expressed their solidarity to Ukraine.
- Bloober Team, the game company known for their horror video games such as Blair Witch, Layers of Fear and The Medium announced that they will block its games in Russia and Belarus. The company tweeted: "We've been working with our partners to put the games down from the stores in these countries – the ban coming into effect first on Steam." They previously already posted on the day of the invasion that they stand in solidarity with Ukraine.
- Wube Software, a game developer based in the Czech Republic and creators of Factorio, posted on Steam in support of Ukraine, calling Russia's military actions inexcusable.
- Unity Technologies, the developers of the Unity Engine, expressed their solidarity and support for Ukraine. Internally Unity employees are directly supporting four international humanitarian charities focused on helping people in Ukraine with "triple-matching" commitment from the company and their leaders. Unity also launched two related initiatives on Unity Asset Store.
- EA Sports removed all Russian clubs from NHL 22 and FIFA 22 after the Ukraine invasion. In a statement EA said, "EA Sports has initiated processes to remove the Russian national team and all Russian clubs from EA Sports FIFA products including: FIFA 22, FIFA Mobile and FIFA Online." On 4 March, Electronic Arts, parent company of EA Sports, announced that they will no longer sell content, games, or virtual currency in territories of Russia and Belarus. "We have made the decision to stop sales of our games and content, including virtual currency bundles, in Russia and Belarus while this conflict continues," EA said in a statement. "As a result, our games and content will no longer be available for purchase in our Russian region storefront on Origin or the EA app, including through in-game stores. We are also working with our platform partners to remove our titles from their stores and stop the sale of new in-game content in the region."
- IO Interactive, a game developing studio based in Copenhagen, known for the game franchise Hitman, published a statement on their Twitter account. They expressed their solidarity to Ukraine and announced that they will be donating €100,000 to the Red Cross to get humanitarian aid those in need.
- Devolver Digital on 3 March 2022 tweeted their support for Ukraine and linked pages to donate to Ukraine's humanitarian efforts.
- The Pokémon Company on 3 March 2022 posted their statement on Twitter, expressing their solidarity to families and children of Ukraine and made an immediate donation of $200,000 to their partners at GlobalGiving to provide humanitarian relief.
- Microsoft announced on 4 March 2022 that they will suspend sales in Russia, including Xbox hardware and games. This will include also services that Microsoft provides such as Xbox/PC Game Pass. The move follows a public call from Ukraine for game companies, including Xbox, to temporarily stop support for Russia and Belarus.
- Remedy Entertainment, a game studio known for games like Alan Wake, Control and Quantum Break, published their statement on Twitter expressing solidarity. They announced a donation of €50,000 to the Red Cross, and that they will support their Ukrainian and Russian employees.
- Nintendo announced on 4 March 2022 that the Russian Nintendo eShop will be placed into maintenance mode, effectively disabling purchases and downloads for Nintendo Switch digital games, content, and microtransactions in Russia. The payment service served used by Nintendo suspended the processing of payments in rubles as a result of the sanctions. Nintendo later postponed Advance Wars 1+2: Re-Boot Camp from its original release date of 8 April 2022 to an unknown date. On 10 March, Nintendo have announced that they will stop sales in Russia for the foreseeable future. The company expressed their solidarity to Ukraine; a spokesperson for Nintendo said, "We would like to express our concern for all those affected by the conflict."
- Activision Blizzard, the game company known for games such as Call of Duty, World of Warcraft and Overwatch, announced that they will suspend new sales of its games in Russia.
- Epic Games, the creator of Epic Store and Fortnite, made an announcement on their official Twitter news account that they will be suspending commerce with Russia. However, they stressed that they are not blocking access to communication tools and that they will remain online, as "the free world should keep all lines of dialogue open". On 20 March 2022, Epic Games announced that they will be committing all its Fortnite proceeds from 20 March 2022 through 3 April 2022 to humanitarian relief for the people affected by the war in Ukraine. Xbox would also be assisting by contributing net proceeds for Fortnite.
- Coffee Stain Studios, a Swedish game developer and publisher, posted a response on their Twitter page and expressed their solidarity to Ukrainians and decided that they will donate $250,000 to Save the Children and Red Cross in "providing the aid to those affected in Ukraine".
- Take-Two Interactive, an American video game holding company that have published the Grand Theft Auto series, Mafia series and Red Dead Redemption games, announced that they are halting sales of their games and services in Russia and Belarus as a result of its invasion of Ukraine. "We have watched recent events unfold in Ukraine with concern and sadness," Take-Two Interactive vice president of corporate communications Alan Lewis said in an email sent to PC Gamer. "After significant consideration, last week, we decided to stop new sales, installations, and marketing support across all our labels in Russia and Belarus at this time." Rockstar Games, a subsidiary of Take-Two, blocked GTA 5, GTA Online, RDR2, and all of its games in Russia. Users from platforms such as Steam cannot access the aforementioned games.
- PlayStation quietly removed Gran Turismo 7 from sale in Russia presumably as a response of Russian invasion in Ukraine. No official statements were made. After week of silence, On 9 March, PlayStation's parent company Sony announced that it will suspend all sales in Russia. Sony has a significant presence in the Russian gaming industry: "PlayStation has the largest installed base, so if a company on the console side has a particularly hard choice from a purely financial angle, it's Sony," said Lewis Ward, head of gaming at research firm IDC. Sony also expressed solidarity with Ukraine and announced a US$2 million donation to the United Nations High Commissioner for Refugees (UNHCR) and the international NGO Save the Children.
- Bandai Namco tweeted an expression of solidarity with Ukraine and vowed to donate ¥100 million to Save the Children for humanitarian causes.
- Square Enix, a Japanese entertainment conglomerate and video game company, put out their statement where they vowed to donate $500,000 to the UNHCR. Square Enix also said its group companies launched an employee fundraiser and matching gift program to benefit the International Committee of the Red Cross, UNICEF and Doctors Without Borders".
- Pixel Federation, a Slovak based game developer of the mobile application game Train station 2, had replaced Region 6 (Russia) with Finland as of April 4, 2022. They had announced previously that their "position stands firm with the people calling for peace". They added that "the change has been deemed important, so that our players can enjoy the game without a constant reminder of the harshness of today's reality".

=== Sports ===
Following the invasion, multiple sports events were moved out of Russia and Belarus, suspended, or cancelled. UEFA, the European association football governing body, announced that the 2022 UEFA Champions League Final would be moved from Saint Petersburg to Paris. The Russian Grand Prix for the 2022 Formula One World Championship was suspended and it was cancelled on 1 March. The International Federation of Sport Climbing announced the suspension of the Boulder and Speed World Cup in Moscow, 1–3 April, with intent to relocate and reschedule the event. The International Ski Federation announced that all remaining events in Russia were cancelled. The World Curling Federation announced that the 2022 European Curling Championship, scheduled for 19–26 November, will no longer be held in Perm. The ATP chose to move the St. Petersburg Open tournament. On 27 February 2022, FINA announced that they withdrew Russia's hosting rights for the 2022 World Junior Swimming Championships. On 1 March 2022, the International Volleyball Federation withdrew Russia's hosting rights of the 2022 Men's World Championship scheduled for August and September.

==== Individual athletes, teams, and organizations ====
The invasion affected Ukraine's participation at the 2022 Winter Paralympics in Beijing, China, with International Paralympic Committee President Andrew Parsons describing transporting the Ukrainian team to Beijing as being an enormous challenge. On 2 March 2022, Parsons confirmed the team should be able to compete at the Games.

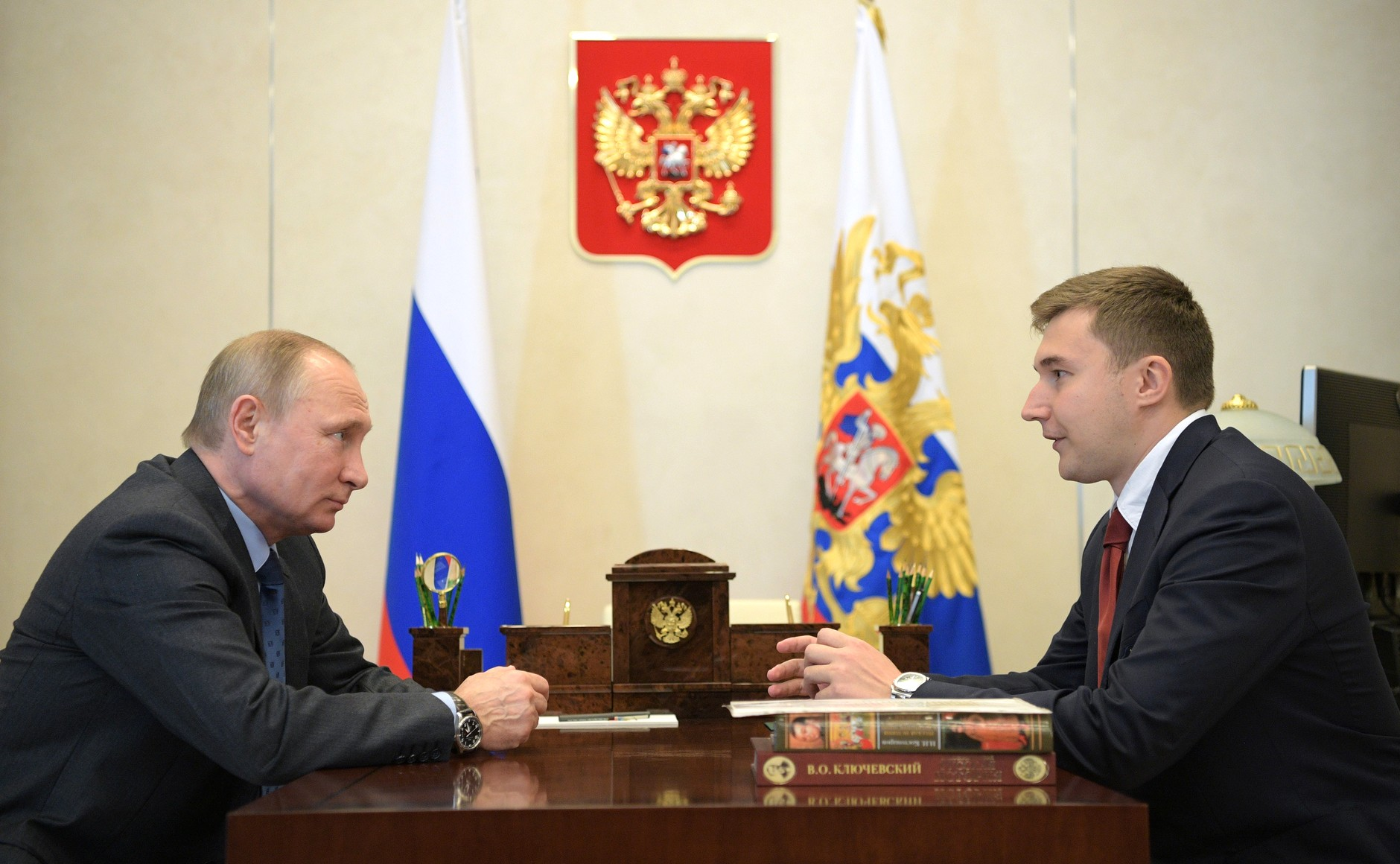
Vladimir Putin with Sergey Karjakin in 2017

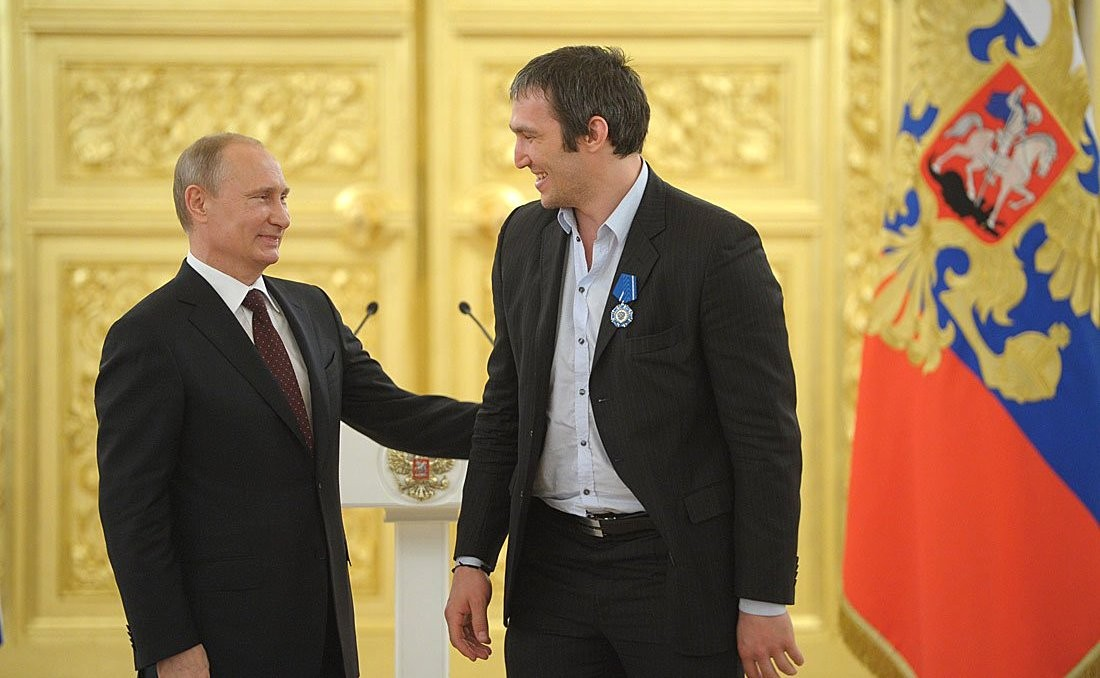
Vladimir Putin with Alex Ovechkin in 2014

Russians
Some Russian athletes made deliberately ambiguous statements for peace, without directly mentioning the Russian invasion.
Russian NHL player Alex Ovechkin, the captain of the Washington Capitals, pleaded for "no more war". However, Czech former Detroit Red Wings and Ottawa Senators goaltender Dominik Hašek responded to Ovechkin and criticized him for his past support of Putin, stating "What!? Not only an alibist, a chicken shit, but also a liar!", while also calling on the NHL to suspend all Russian players.
Russian figure skater Evgenia Medvedeva called for "this all [to end] as soon as possible, like a bad dream".
Former captain of the Russian football team Igor Denisov publicly condemned the invasion of Ukraine, stating that the entire event was a complete catastrophe. Following his statement it was mentioned that it was possible for him to be "jailed or killed".
Russian tennis players Daniil Medvedev and Andrey Rublev called for peace between nations, while five-time Grand Slam champion Maria Sharapova said that she opposed the war and called for an end of the invasion. Sharapova also pledged to give donations to Ukraine. Even after Medvedev called for peace, he received backlash at the Indian Wells.
Russian chess player Ian Nepomniachtchi made a more concrete statement, tweeting: "History has seen many Black Thursdays. But today is blacker than the others. #saynotowar". His teammate Sergey Karjakin supported Russia's invasion, however, and released a message approving of Putin's actions; he will face FIDE's Ethics and Disciplinary Commission for his comments and is no longer welcome at the 2022 top tournaments Norway Chess, London Chess Classic, and Grand Chess Tour. Russian chess grandmaster and longtime Putin critic Garry Kasparov denounced the invasion. 44 Russian chess players, among them Nepomniachtchi, women's world rapid champion Alexandra Kosteniuk, and grandmasters Daniil Dubov and Peter Svidler appealed directly to Putin to stop the war. Alexandra Kosteniuk and others left Russia. She switched to Switzerland.
Former Russian Formula One driver Daniil Kvyat said he did not support the war and hoped for a peaceful solution, but also stated it is an "unfair solution" to ban all Russian athletes. Nikita Mazepin, who was a driver for Haas F1 Team when the invasion began, tweeted that he was "not in control over a lot of what is being said and done". Mazepin had been accused of effectively buying his place onto a team thanks to his father Dmitry Mazepin's oligarch status and ties to Russian President Vladimir Putin and his sponsorship of Haas. The team eventually terminated its contract with Mazepin. Alexander Smolyar, the only Russian in Formula One's support series Formula 3, withdrew from the 2022 season, after his major backer SMP Racing refused to accept the FIA's code of conduct regarding the participation of Russian competitors and also ending their European program. Smolyar however later reversed his decision and took part in the season-opening race in Bahrain under a neutral license. Russian team G-Drive Racing announced that they will withdraw from the FIA World Endurance Championship after team principal Roman Rusinov's refusal to accept the FIA code of conduct on Russian racing drivers. W Series announced that Russian driver Irina Sidorkova was suspended from competing until further notice.
Russian gymnast Ivan Kuliak wore a "Z" sticker during a gymnastics World Cup event in Qatar during the medal ceremony in support of Russia's invasion of Ukraine; "Z" is commonly used as a pro-war symbol by the Russian army in Ukraine and could mean, among other things, Za pobedy (for the victory). The International Gymnastics Federation (IGF) have since announced that they would be taking disciplinary action against Kuliak, and on May 18, the IGF announced that Kuliak was banned from competition for a year for displaying the symbol, and his result and prize money from the aforementioned event were stripped as well.
Roman Abramovich, owner of Chelsea F.C, relinquished running of the club to the trustees of the club charitable foundation following calls for him to be sanctioned due to his links with Putin and the Russian state, while still retaining ownership of the club.
Some Russian well-known figure skaters including Nikita Katsalapov, Victoria Sinitsina, Evgenia Tarasova, and Vladimir Morozov were seen attending the pro-war rally held by Putin.

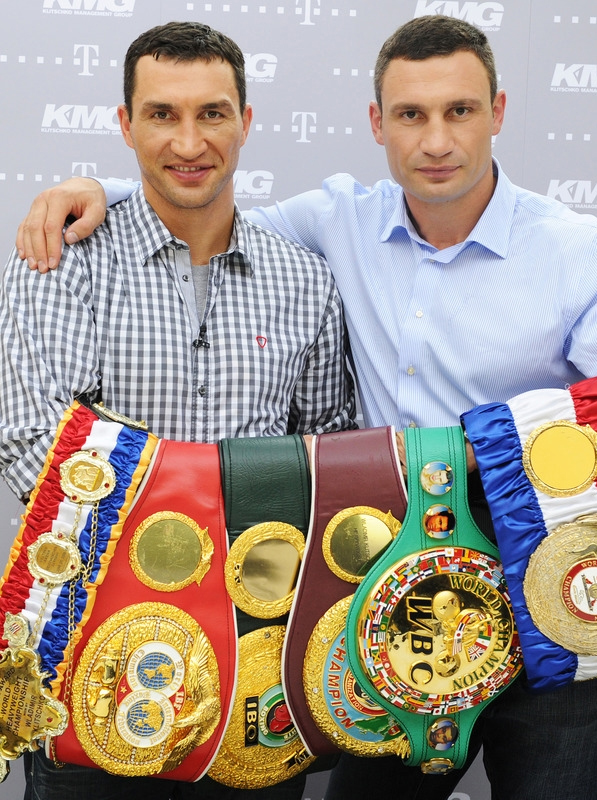
Wladimir Klitschko and Vitali Klitschko with every title in the heavyweight division, 2012. Left to right: The Ring, IBF, IBO, WBO, WBC, and WBA.

Ukrainians
Various high-profile Ukrainian sportspersons joined the fight against the Russian invasion.
On 25 February 2022, Ukrainian brothers Wladimir Klitschko and Vitali Klitschko, both former heavyweight champions, announced their intent to join and take arms alongside the Ukrainian Army. On 27 February 2022, after traveling back to Ukraine, Ukrainian former world champion in three weight classes Vasiliy Lomachenko joined the territorial defense battalion of his hometown of Bilhorod-Dnistrovskyi. Shortly after, Ukrainian heavyweight champion Oleksandr Usyk also announced that he was joining a Ukrainian territorial defense battalion on 28 February 2022.
The NBA's two Ukrainian players, Alex Len of the Sacramento Kings and Sviatoslav Mykhailiuk of the Toronto Raptors, both condemned the invasion.
The Ukrainian fencing team was disqualified from the 2022 Fencing World Cup in Cairo, after it refused to face Russia in the quarter-finals.
Ukrainian former tennis player Sergiy Stakhovsky said that he has been enlisted to the Ukrainian reserve's army and will fight to repel the Russian invasion, while fellow tennis star Dayana Yastremska announced that she will donate the prize money she won from WTA Lyon Open to help those in need during the war efforts.
The Ukrainian Winter Paralympics team who were competing in the 2022 Winter Paralympics gathered for a rally in the Olympic Village in Beijing calling for peace.
A group of Ukrainian footballers Oleksandr Zinchenko, Andriy Shevchenko, Andriy Yarmolenko, and Viktor Tsyhankov condemned the war on Instagram; Zinchenko also wished death on Putin which was taken down by Instagram later, while Yarmolenko has called for the Ukrainian people to unite against the invasion and support the army. After participating in the 2022 Winter Olympics, Ukrainian biathlete Dmytro Pidruchnyi joined the Ukrainian military to fight the Russian invasion in the country.
Ukrainian former pair skater who currently represents Germany Aljona Savchenko slammed the four Russian figure skaters for attending the pro-war rally, saying that she was "speechless" upon seeing the quartet attending the rally, and called their decision as "inhumane".

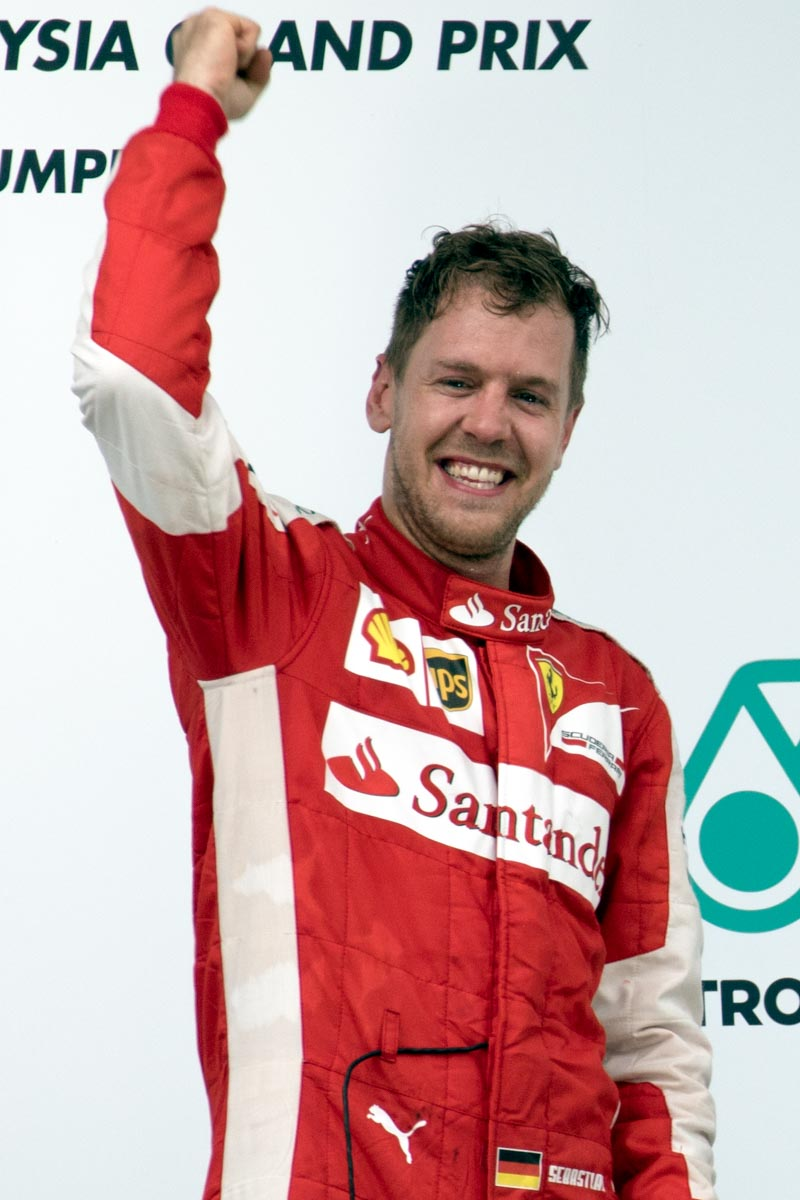
Sebastian Vettel, at the podium of the 2015 Malaysian Grand Prix.

Auto racing
The invasion raised concerns from Formula One drivers, including Red Bull Racing Belgian-Dutch driver and reigning champion Max Verstappen, Aston Martin German driver and four-time champion Sebastian Vettel, and Scuderia AlphaTauri French driver Pierre Gasly, with Vettel threatening to boycott the race in Sochi should the race go as planned. Seven-time champion Lewis Hamilton wrote on Instagram sympathizing Ukraine citizens and standing with Russian citizens who "oppose this violence and seek peace, often at risk to their own freedom." Vettel and Gasly have since sported helmet designs in support of Ukraine, though Vettel had to make a minor modification to his helmet due to the inclusion of the flag of Northern Cyprus, which its independence was declared "invalid" by the United Nations Security Council.
Former chief executive of Formula One Group Bernie Ecclestone slammed the decision to ditch the race in Sochi, saying that it "does not make sense" as it would not affect anyone at all. Ecclestone also stated that the sporting sanctions was not going to punish Russia at all and would not make Putin change his mind.
Finnish rally driver Kalle Rovanperä paid tribute to the people suffering in Ukraine after winning the Rally Sweden saying that he did not feel like celebrating too much and hoped for the Ukrainian people to find the strength to face these difficult times.
Before the beginning of the season-opening Qatar motorcycle Grand Prix, MotoGP riders posed for their traditional 'back-to-school' photo on Thursday behind a banner proclaiming "United for Peace" in response to the Russian invasion of Ukraine. MotoGP six-time champion Marc Marquez condemned the invasion, admitting that the sport can offer its support to the people of Ukraine but also decried that the sporting bodies' support for Ukraine is not enough, stating "There are people much more important than us that must stop this,".
Former NASCAR Cup Series driver and current owner of Richard Childress Racing, American Richard Childress, announced on Fox News TV that he would donate one million rounds of ammunition to Ukraine. Fellow Cup team Hendrick Motorsports pledged $200,000 to a Ukrainian relief fund operated by Samaritan's Purse, with additional $2,000 for each lap led by Hendrick drivers in the 2022 Pennzoil 400.
NASCAR Xfinity Series driver Stefan Parsons drove a special "Ukraine Strong" paint scheme at the 2022 Alsco Uniforms 300, with sponsorship from advertising agency Sokal. Cup driver Josh Bilicki did the same for the AdventHealth 400 with the Ukrainian American Coordinating Council as sponsor.
Bandy
Sweden and Finland announced that they will boycott the 2020 Bandy World Championship in Irkutsk which was scheduled to be held in October 2022. Both countries also boycotted the World under-17 Championships set to be held in Kemerovo in March 2022.

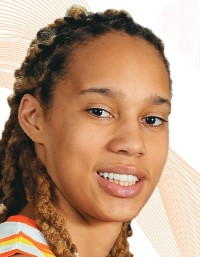
Brittney Griner

Basketball
American two-time Olympic champion Brittney Griner was arrested on drug charges in Russia by the Russian Federal Security Service, allegedly for the possession of hashish oil. There is concern that Russia may be holding her hostage as a response to the international sanctions imposed against Russia after the Russian invasion of Ukraine.
NBA teams Sacramento Kings and Denver Nuggets held a moment of silence as a form of solidarity with Ukraine before the match held on 24 February 2022 by linking each other arms.
Former Boston Celtics player Enes Kanter Freedom showed his solidarity with Ukrainian people. Freedom also called out NBA hypocrisy for the Ukraine flag pins initiative as his team used to beg him not to wear the anti-China sneaker he wore last year which is allegedly the cause of his dismissal.
Boxing
Irish boxing legend and boxing promoter Barry McGuigan praised the Klitschko brothers who fought to defend Ukraine; McGuigan also urged the sporting world to turn their back on Russia and Vladimir Putin as he stated "Until there is peace, no Russian fighter should be seen in a ring again". The same message was echoed by fellow Irish boxer Kellie Harrington who stated her respect for the brothers.
Football/soccer
The Football Association said England teams at all levels and age groups will not compete against Russian opponents due to the invasion of Ukraine. They said: "Out of solidarity with the Ukraine and to wholeheartedly condemn the atrocities being committed by the Russian leadership, The FA can confirm that we won't play against Russia in any international fixtures for the foreseeable future. This includes any potential match at any level of senior, age group or para football." And the boycott of matches will be "for the foreseeable future."

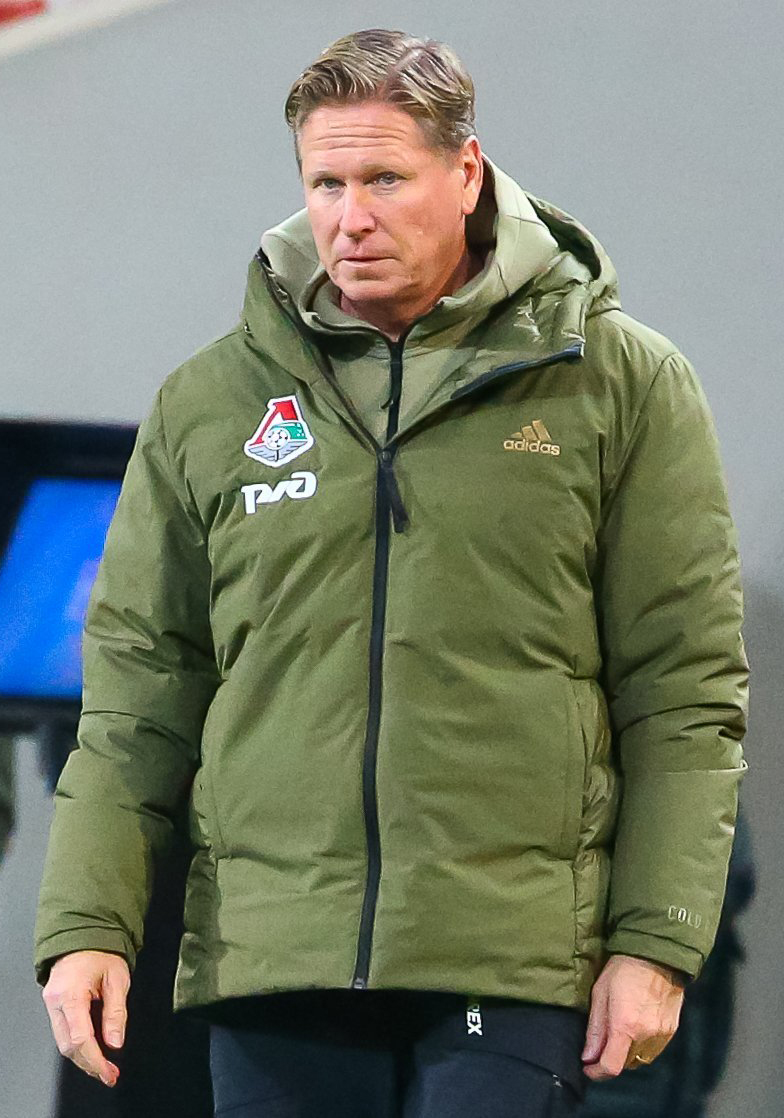
Markus Gisdol

FC Lokomotiv Moscow's coach German Markus Gisdol quit in protest of Russia's invasion of Ukraine.
Polish, Swedish and Czech football association announced that they will boycott the UEFA World Cup Qualifying match for 2022 FIFA World Cup against Russia and in Russian territory should the match go as planned. FIFA later decide the match to be cancelled and disqualified Russia national football team from participating in 2022 world cup.
Real Madrid announced it will donate the sum of €1 million to their "Everyone with Ukraine" campaign, which was launched on 5 March for displaced people in Ukraine.
Hellas Verona fans revealed a banner showing coordinates of Naples with flags of Russia and Ukraine suggesting the city should be targeted. The banner has been publicly condemned with Napoli boss Luciano Spalletti insisting that the fans who made it should "never set foot in a stadium again."
Ice hockey
The Kontinental Hockey League (KHL) team Jokerit, based in Helsinki, Finland, announced their decision to leave the KHL, in which 19 of the 22 teams were based in Russia, in response to the invasion. Three days after Jokerit left, Dinamo Riga, based in the capital of Latvia, also decided to leave the KHL for the same reason.
Canadian former center and hockey legend Wayne Gretzky called on the IIHF to not allow Russia to participate at the rescheduled World Juniors tournament in Alberta, Canada.
Skiing
Australian aerial skier Danielle Scott announced that she will boycott in the 2021–2022 FIS Freestyle Ski World Cup final scheduled to be held in Russia. The announcement was followed by the cancellation of remaining events in Russia.
Tennis
British tennis player Andy Murray pledged to donate the prize money he wins from competition for Ukraine, to help children that has been impacted during the war.
Serbian tennis star Novak Djokovic stated his support for Stakhovsky who was enlisted in the Ukrainian army to fight the invasion.
German tennis player Eva Lys slammed her Russian opponent Ksenia Zaytseva for 'laughing about' the war.
Swiss tennis star Roger Federer pledged to donate $500,000 to help the children affected by the war in Ukraine.

==== Sponsorship ====
- German football club Schalke 04 announced that it would remove the logo of Gazprom, its main sponsor, from its uniforms.
- Formula One team Haas announced the removal of the Russian state-owned Uralkali sponsorship during the third day of pre-season testing in Barcelona, while also modifying the livery on their Haas VF-22 cars to remove a design of the Russian flag. The sponsorship was officially terminated on 5 March. Additionally, the son of Uralkali's owner Nikita Mazepin was removed from the team. Hitech Grand Prix, a team running in Formula One's support series Formulas 2 and 3, also terminated their sponsorship with Uralkali.
- English football club Manchester United ended its sponsorship agreements with Aeroflot.
- English football club Everton suspended its sponsorship agreements with USM, MegaFon and Yota. The three companies are chaired by the owner of the club Farhad Moshiri.
- Swimwear company Speedo ended its sponsorship of Russian swimmer Evgeny Rylov, after he appeared during a pro-war rally at Luzhniki Stadium on 18 March 2022. The company stated that it would donate "any outstanding sponsorship fees" to the UN Refugee Agency.

==== Sports organizations ====
The International Olympic Committee (IOC) condemned Russia's "breach of the Olympic Truce adopted by the UN General Assembly". Although the 2022 Winter Olympics in Beijing concluded four days prior to Russia's invasion of Ukraine, the truce by its terms was set to last until seven days after the 2022 Winter Paralympics concluded in mid-March. IOC President Thomas Bach called for peace. The IOC stated they are greatly concerned about the Olympic community in Ukraine. The IOC Executive Board initially proposed to sanction Russia and Belarus by stripping both countries' rights to host sporting events, and banning the use of their national flags and anthems. The IOC later called on individual federations to ban Russian and Belarusian athletes from participating in any international events until further notice. The IOC also withdrew the Olympic Order from Vladimir Putin.

On 2 March, the International Paralympic Committee initially said that Russian and Belarusian athletes would be allowed to participate under a neutral flag, with their results not counting in the medal standings. As a result of criticism by several National Paralympic Committees, who threatened to boycott the games, the IPC announced on 3 March that they were altering their earlier decision, and banned Russian and Belarusian athletes from competing at the 2022 Winter Paralympics.

Archery
The World Archery Federation banned Russian and Belarusian athletes and officials. It also banned the flags and anthems of Russia and Belarus, and said that no archery events would be held in the two countries.
Athletics
World Athletics banned Russian and Belarusian athletes and officials from World Athletic Series events, including Russian athletes who had Authorised Neutral Athlete (ANA) status.

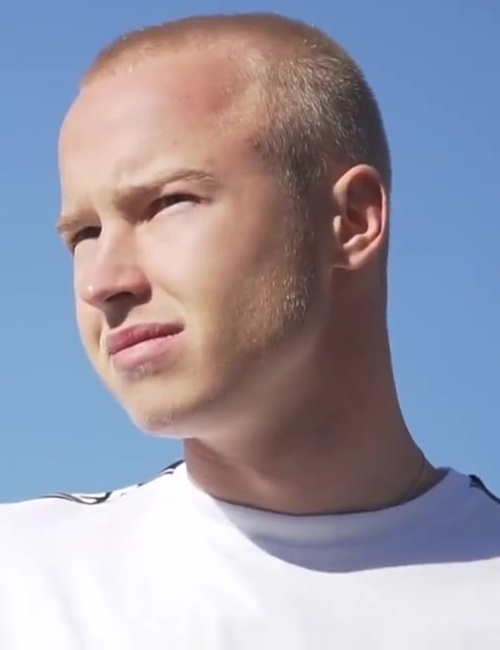
Nikita Mazepin

Auto racing
The Fédération Internationale de l'Automobile (FIA) banned Russian and Belarusian teams, and banned the holding of competitions in Russia or Belarus. It also excluded Russian and Belarusian FIA members from their roles as elected officers or commission members, and banned FIA grants to Russian and Belarusian members. Individual Russia and Belarus competitors were allowed to enter races as neutrals, without their national symbols, flags, colors, and anthems. The FIA cancelled the 2022 edition of the Russian Grand Prix in Sochi, initially scheduled for 25 September. The FIA terminated the contract to host the race, meaning the planned move of the race venue from Sochi to Igora in 2023 would not materialize.
The Automobile Federation of Ukraine president asked FIA President Mohammed bin Sulayem to have the FIA ban all Russian license holders from any FIA-sanctioned events, but the FIA decided to still allow Russian and Belarusian license holders to compete, though under a neutral flag.
British motorsport governing body Motorsport UK barred Russian and Belarusian drivers from competing in British motorsport events, thus preventing Russian F1 driver Nikita Mazepin from participating in the upcoming 2022 edition of the British Grand Prix in Silverstone scheduled to be held in July (in any event, he was sacked by his team), with Motorsport Australia considering a similar move. Mazepin's position was also in limbo due to his father Dmitry Mazepin being a Russian oligarch tied to Russian President Vladimir Putin. On 5 March, Haas F1 terminated its contract with Mazepin, along with its contract with the title sponsor, Mazepin's father's state-owned Uralkali; Nikita was subsequently replaced by Kevin Magnussen, who had previously driven for Haas. NASCAR announced that drivers will be able to show support for Ukraine on their cars with NASCAR's approval.
Badminton
Badminton World Federation (BWF) banned Russian and Belarusian athletes and officials from tournaments. It cancelled all BWF-sanctioned events in Russia and Belarus. It also banned all Russia and Belarus national flags and symbols from being displayed at any BWF-sanctioned event.
Bandy
The Federation of International Bandy excluded Russia from participating in the 2022 Women's Bandy World Championship. The men's 2020 Bandy World Championship, already postponed to 2022 due to the COVID-19 pandemic, was cancelled after Finland, Sweden, Norway, and the United States announced that they would not take part in the competition in Russia due to the Russian invasion of Ukraine.
Baseball/softball
World Baseball Softball Confederation banned Russia and Belarus athletes and officials.
Basketball
The International Basketball Federation (FIBA) banned Russian teams and officials. EuroLeague suspended Russian teams CSKA Moscow, UNICS Kazan, and Zenit St. Petersburg. Eurocup Basketball suspended PBC Lokomotiv Kuban. EuroLeague Women suspended UMMC Ekaterinburg, Dynamo Kursk, and MBA Moscow. The National Basketball Association (NBA), which did not have any Russian players, suspended all business activities in Russia, including broadcasts.
Biathlon
The International Biathlon Union (IBU) banned Russian and Belarusian flags at their events.
Boxing
The International Boxing Association (formerly AIBA)—which has increased its ties to Russia since the election of Umar Kremlev as its president in 2020, and has faced concerns over its governance since then—initially banned Russian and Belarusian boxers from competing under their flags per IOC recommendations. In September 2022, the IBA suspended the Ukraine Boxing Federation, accusing it of interfering with a proposed election. At the 2022 European Junior Boxing Championships afterward, the Ukraine delegation was initially prohibited from competing under its flag, resulting in multiple boxers forfeiting their matches in protest. The IBA subsequently stated that the delegation would be allowed to compete under their flag. On 5 October, the IBA lifted its ban on Russian and Belarusian athletes and officials, stating that it "strongly believes that politics shouldn't have any influence on sports." The move faced criticism, with Finland and Sweden stating that they would boycott any IBA-sanctioned event featuring Russian or Belarusian boxers.
Canoeing
The International Canoe Federation banned Russia and Belarus athletes and officials.
Chess
The International Chess Federation (FIDE) announced that the 44th Chess Olympiad, originally planned to be held in Moscow, will not take place in Russia. FIDE later announced that "no official FIDE chess competitions and events will be held in Russia and Belarus," expressing its "grave concern about the military action started by Russia", talking of "war" and condemning "any use of military means to resolve political conflicts".
Climbing
The International Federation of Sport Climbing banned Russian and Belarusian athletes and officials. It also suspended the Boulder and Speed World Cup in Moscow, scheduled for 1–3 April, with intent to relocate and reschedule the event.
Cycling
The International Cycling Union banned Russian and Belarusian national teams, as well as six teams from those countries, including the Pro Tour Gazprom–RusVelo team. Individual Russian and Belarus competitors will be allowed as neutrals, without national flags/emblems. The Union Cycliste Internationale (UCI) cancelled events scheduled to take place in Russia until at least the end of the year.
Equestrian
The International Equestrian Federation cancelled all 57 remaining events in 2022 in Russia and Belarus.

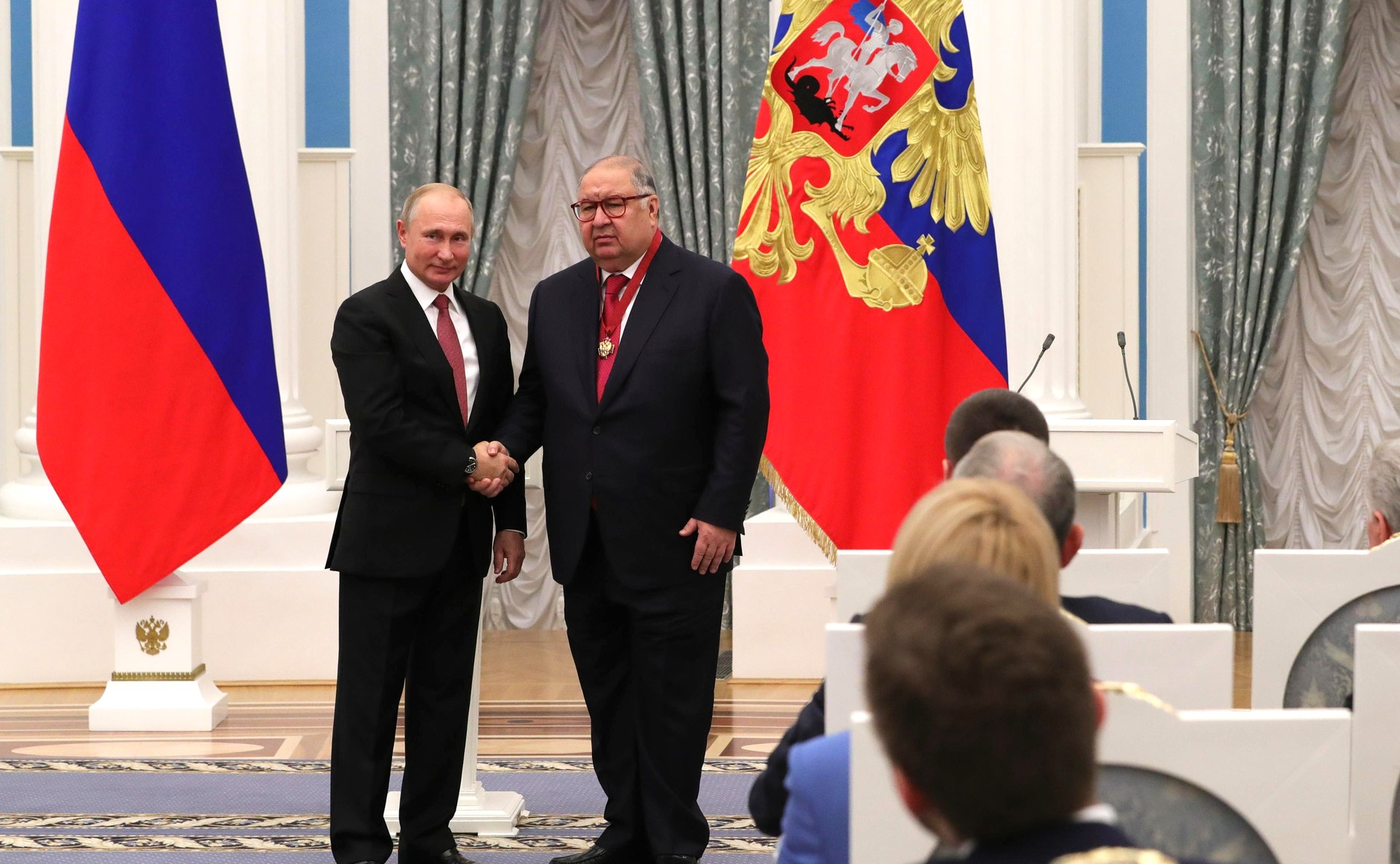
FIE Russian President Alisher Usmanov with Putin.

Fencing
The International Fencing Federation (FIE) banned Russian and Belarusian athletes and officials. It cancelled or will relocate all events in Russia and Belarus. FIE Russian President Alisher Usmanov stepped down after the European Union imposed economic sanctions on him. He said "I believe that such a decision is unfair, and the reasons employed to justify the sanctions are a set of false and defamatory allegations damaging my honor, dignity, and business reputation. I will use all legal means to protect my honor and reputation." On 27 February 2022, an FIE World Cup in Sochi was called off on the final day of competition.

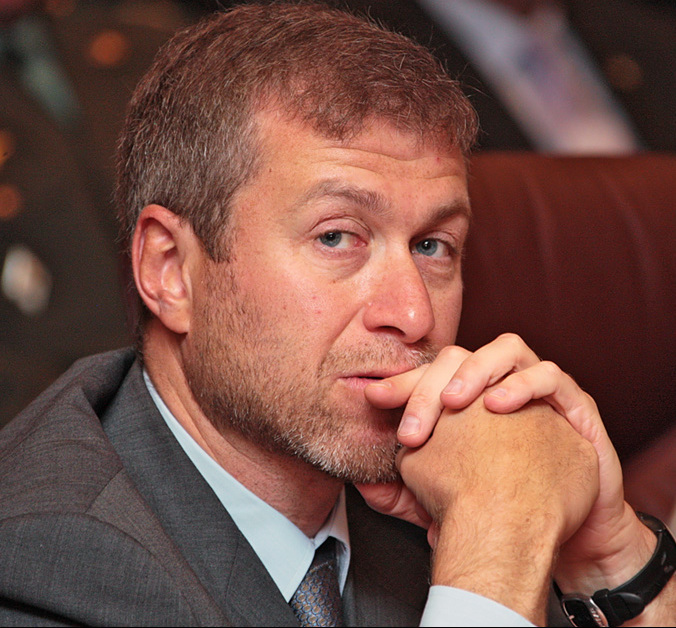
Roman Abramovich

Football/soccer
The Union of European Football Associations (UEFA) and the Fédération Internationale de Football Association (FIFA) suspended all Russian clubs and national teams from all of their competitions. UEFA announced that the 2022 UEFA Champions League Final, due to be held in St. Petersburg, would be moved out of Russia to France in response to the invasion. UEFA also terminated its sponsorship contract with Gazprom, a Russian state-owned oil and gas giant. The European Club Association suspended its seven Russian members – Zenit St Petersburg, FC Spartak Moscow, Lokomotiv Moscow, CSKA Moscow, FC Krasnodar, Rubin Kazan, and FC Rostov. Russian oligarch Roman Abramovich announced he would be selling Chelsea F.C. soon after the invasion commenced and donating all the proceeds to Ukrainian victims.
Futsal
FIFA and Union of European Football Associations (UEFA) suspended from FIFA and UEFA competitions all Russian teams, both national representative teams or club teams.
Golf
The International Golf Federation banned Russian and Belarusian athletes and officials.
Gymnastics
The International Gymnastics Federation (FIG) barred Russian and Belarusian athletes and officials, including judges. It also announced that "all FIG World Cup and World Challenge Cup events planned to take place in Russia and Belarus are cancelled, and no other FIG events will be allocated to Russia or Belarus until further notice." FIG banned the Russian and Belarusian flags at their events.
Handball
The International Handball Federation banned Russian and Belarusian athletes and officials. The European Handball Federation suspended the national teams of Russia and Belarus, as well as Russian and Belarusian clubs competing in European handball competitions. Referees, officials, and commission members from Russia and Belarus will not be called upon for future activities. And new organisers will be sought for the YAC 16 EHF Beach Handball EURO and the Qualifier Tournaments for the Beach Handball EURO 2023, which were to be held in Moscow.
Ice hockey
The International Ice Hockey Federation (IIHF) banned Russia and Belarus from international ice hockey, disqualifying their teams from future IIHF-sanctioned events, and stripping Russia's hosting rights to the 2023 World Junior Ice Hockey Championships and 2023 IIHF World Championship. The two events were rebid and awarded to Halifax/Moncton, Canada and Tampere, Finland/Riga, Latvia respectively.
The National Hockey League (NHL), which with 50 has the most Russian players of the four major US sports leagues, condemned the invasion. It suspended indefinitely all Russian business deals, social media, websites, and promotional posts. It will also no longer consider Russia as a host for future NHL events. It will not take action, however, with regard to the Russian and Belarusian players in the league, and will let them finish the season as normal. It added extra security for Russian and Belarusian athletes following reports of harassment, death threats, and increased hostilities in both the United States and Canada.
Judo
The International Judo Federation (IJF) removed Putin as Honorary President and ambassador. The IJF also removed Russian Arkady Rotenberg as member of the IJF's executive committee. It canceled all tournaments in Russia. It continued to allow Russian judokas to compete, but without Russian flags or symbols.
Karate
The European Karate Federation (EKF) stripped Moscow as host of the 2023 European Karate Championships.
Modern pentathlon
The International Modern Pentathlon Union banned Russian and Belarusian athletes and officials.
Motorcycle racing
Fédération Internationale de Motocyclisme (FIM) banned all Russian and Belarusian motorcycle riders, teams, officials, and competitions. It cancelled one of the 2022 Speedway Grand Prix events, FIM Speedway GP of MFR – Togliatti, which was supposed to be held in Tolyatti on 9 July, stating that "in the current circumstances it is not possible to hold the FIM Speedway GP of MFR Togliatti."
Orienteering
The International Orienteering Federation suspended the membership of the Russian Orienteering Federation. The IOF also disallowed Russian orienteering athletes from participating in IOF events (even as neutral athletes), cancelled all organising rights for IOF events and activities in Russia, and suspended all Russian members appointed to IOF official bodies.
Rowing
The World Rowing Federation banned Russian and Belarusian athletes and officials.
Rugby league
The International Rugby League and European Rugby League banned Russia from all international rugby league competitions.
Rugby union
World Rugby and Rugby Europe suspended both Belarus and Russia from international and European continental rugby union competition. In addition, the Rugby Union of Russia was suspended from World Rugby and Rugby Europe. The Rugby Union of Belarus was suspended from Rugby Europe.
Sailing
World Sailing banned Russian and Belarusian athletes and officials.
Shooting
The International Shooting Sport Federation banned Russia and Belarus athletes.
Skateboarding
World Skate banned Russian and Belarusian athletes and officials from its competitions, and will not stage any events in Russia or Belarus in 2022.
Skating and speedskating
The International Skating Union barred Russian and Belarusian athletes from competition.
Skiing
The International Ski Federation (FIS) banned Russian and Belarusian athletes. It announced that six World Cup events originally planned to take place in Russia in the 2021–22 season will be cancelled or moved to other locations.
Surfing
The International Surfing Association banned Russian athletes and officials.
Swimming
FINA has banned all Russian and Belarusian athletes from their events and withdrew Russia from numerous events. Furthermore, it opened up a disciplinary procedure against Russian swimmer Evgeny Rylov for allegedly participating in the 2022 Moscow rally. Before the ban, FINA initially allowed Russian and Belarusian swimmers to compete as neutrals without any country flag, colors, symbols, or anthems. The FINA Order awarded to Vladimir Putin was withdrawn.
Table Tennis
The International Table Tennis Federation banned Russia and Belarus athletes and officials.
Taekwondo
World Taekwondo banned Russian and Belarusian athletes and officials. It revoked Vladimir Putin's honorary 9th degree Dan black belt, condemned the violence, and said that Russia's action was against the sporting vision. It also stated that no events will be held in Russia and Belarus during current circumstances.
Tennis
The Association of Tennis Professionals (ATP) moved the 2022 St. Petersburg Open tournament from Saint Petersburg to Nur-Sultan, Kazakhstan, presumably due to the political situation in Russia. The International Tennis Federation (ITF) cancelled all events in Russia and Belarus, and postponed the ITF World Tennis Tour M15 event due to take place in Ukraine. The ITF excluded Russia and Belarus from international team events, which include the Davis Cup, the Billie Jean King Cup, and the ATP Cup, and suspended the Russian Tennis Federation and the Belarus Tennis Federation. The All England Club announced that individual players from Belarus and Russia would be prohibited from competing at the 2022 Wimbledon Championships. The organisers cited safety risks, and concerns that their performance could be leveraged as propaganda by the Russian government and state media.
The ATP and the Women's Tennis Association (WTA) refused to yield to international pressure to ban individual players from competition, allowing them to compete as neutral athletes. The associations argued that doing so violated the principle that a players' right to compete should be based solely on merit and not nationality. On 20 May 2022, the ATP and WTA announced that they would not award world ranking points for Wimbledon, citing the All England Club's unilateral decision to discriminate against Russian and Belarusian players. The ITF also announced that it will not award ranking points for Wimbledon.
Triathlon
World Triathlon banned Russian and Belarusian athletes and officials.
Volleyball
The International Volleyball Federation suspended all Russian national teams, clubs, and officials, as well as beach and snow volleyball athletes, from all events, and stripped Russia of the right to host the 2022 FIVB Volleyball Men's World Championship in August 2022, and had relocated games that were to be in Russia in June and July to Poland and Slovenia. The European Volleyball Confederation (CEV) also banned all Russian national teams, clubs, and officials from participating in European competition, and suspended all members of Russia from their respective functions in CEV organs.
Weightlifting
The International Weightlifting Federation suspended Russian and Belarusian athletes from competitions. Furthermore, it will not host any events in those countries.
Wrestling
United World Wrestling banned Russian and Belarusian athletes and officials.
American professional wrestling promotion WWE announced it would terminate its broadcasting relationship with Russia, effectively removing its programming, and shut down the WWE Network streaming service. WWE had entered the Russian market in early 2020.

== The Holocaust memorial organizations and Jewish representative ==
In response to Putin's "denazification" as his justification of his military campaign, organizations and museums dedicated to the Holocaust memorial such as Yad Vashem, the Auschwitz Museum in Poland and the US Holocaust Museum condemned the invasion and the remark as exploitation of history.

However, the criticisms of exploitation of the Holocaust history were not against Russia alone. President Zelenskyy's attempt to compare the potential war crimes committed by Russia such as the Bucha massacre with the Holocaust was denounced by the chair of Yad Vashem and Israeli Prime Minister Naftali Bennett while demonstrating their sympathy towards Ukraine.

One of the chief rabbis in Kyiv, Moshe Reuven Azman, released a video on Telegram on 2 March 2022 in which he accused Putin of committing war crimes and denied Putin's claim that Ukraine was run by Nazism, reinforced by the fact that there were not a single nationalist party in the Ukrainian parliament by the time of the invasion. He pleaded people in Russia to rise and protest Kremlin for the invasion.

== Public opinion ==
As a consequence of the Russian invasion, polls have shown a very large shift in from the public towards support for both Finland and Sweden to join NATO.

A poll conducted by NPR/Ipsos between 18 and 21 March 2022 found that only 36% of Americans approved the Biden administration's response to the invasion. A Pew Research Center poll found that 72% of Americans had confidence in Zelenskyy's handling of international affairs.

In China, India, Indonesia, Malaysia, Africa, Latin America, and the Arab regions, many social media users showed sympathy for Russian narratives due in part to distrust of US foreign policy. According to a report published by the US-China Perception Monitor, 75% of Chinese respondents said they agreed or strongly agreed that supporting Russia in the conflict was in China's national interest. A study performed by Airlangga University revealed that 71% of Indonesian netizens supported the invasion. This support was due to affection for Putin's strongman leadership, as well as anti-US and anti-Western political alignments.
