= Anna Ol =

Russian ballet dancer (born 1985)

- Born: 24 June 1985 (age 40); Krasnoyarsk, Russia
- Citizenship: Russia, The Netherlands
- Education: Krasnoyarsk Ballet College; Russian Institute of Theatre Arts (GITIS)
- Occupation: Ballet dancer
- Years active: 1991–present
- Career
- Current group: Dutch National Ballet
- Former groups: Siberian State Ballet; Mikhailovsky Theatre; Stanislavski and Nemirovich-Danchenko Theatre

Anna Ol (born 24 June 1985) is a Russian ballet dancer. She is a principal dancer in the Dutch National Ballet.

== Biography ==
Anna Ol was born in Krasnoyarsk, Russia, to a family of an engineer and housewife. She started dancing at six years old in a small ballet school in Siberia. At the age of ten she started professional education as a ballerina at Krasnoyarsk Ballet College. After the graduation she joined the Siberian State Ballet in Krasnoyarsk as a soloist, and in two years was promoted to prima ballerina. After winning two gold medals at ballet competitions in 2008 and 2010 she joined Ballet of Tatarstan in Kazan as a principal guest dancer. In 2011 she was a guest dancer at the Mikhailovsky Theatre of Saint Petersburg, and in 2012 she joined the Stanislavski and Nemirovich-Danchenko Theatre in Moscow as a principal dancer.

Ol joined the Dutch National Ballet in Amsterdam in 2015 and has since appeared as a guest ballerina across Europe, Russia, North America, South America and Asia. She was considered as the best dancer of the year 2018 by Dance Europe magazine, which also awarded her the Critics' Choice for best performance on multiple occasions.

Ol received the "Ballet magazine" Award (as a Rising Star) and the 'Miss Virtuosity' prize at the Dance Open St Petersburg.

Ol has worked with many choreographers, and works were created for her by David Dawson, Remy Worthmeyer and Juliano Nunes.

After becoming a mother in 2021, she participated in projects related to ballet and art. She has created designs and ballet costumes for the clothing brand La Principale dancewear, and helped to establish and promote the brand.

Ol was certified as a ballet teacher at the Russian Institute of Theatre Arts in 2018. During the COVID-19 pandemic she organized training sessions to help ballet dancers around the world maintain their motivation and shape.

In 2020, Ol was invited as a Ballet Master in the Dancemasterclass project which creates master classes with famous dancers. During her pregnancy, she was filmed as part of a "Motherhood" documentary about pregnant ballerinas, by the same company.

== Career and repertory ==
=== Worked with ballet companies ===
- Siberian state ballet (2003–2011) Krasnoyarsk,
- Tatarstan state opera and ballet theatre (as guest 2010–1015) Kazan,
- Mikhailovsky Theatre (2011–2012) Sankt Peterburg,
- Novosibirsk Academic Opera and Ballet theatre (as guest 2015),
- Stanislavskyi and Nemirovich-Danchenko Moscow Academic Music Theatre (2012- 2015) Moscow,
- Dutch National Ballet (2015–present),
- Semperoper Dresden (2017),
- Teatro Colón Argentina (2017),
- Staatsballet Berlin (2018)

=== Professional Stage Experience ===
==== Ballet college ====
Graduation performance

- Classic pas de deux, Tchaikovsky (choreography by Balanchine), 2003
- Pas de deux White swan “Swan Lake” (by Petipa), 2003
- Pas de deux Blue bird “Sleeping beauty” (by M. Petipa), 2003

==== Siberian state ballet ====
- Odette-Odille "Swan Lake" (by M. Petipa, L.Ivanov),
- Giselle "Giselle"(by Perro, Petipa),
- The Mistress of the Copper Mountain "The Stone Flower" (by Y.Grigorovich),
- Liza "La fille mal gardée"(by M.Peretokin),
- Kitry "Don Quixote" (by V.Gorsky after M. Petipa),
- Svanilda "Coppélia" (by Y.Malkhasyanc),
- Juliette "Romeo and Juliette"(by A.Bobrov),
- Aurora "Sleeping beauty"( by M. Petipa),
- Cinderella “Cinderella” (by S.Bobrov),
- Phrigiya “Spartacus” (by Y. Grigorovich) with Ivan Vasiliev,
- Marie “The Nutcracker” (by S.Bobrov after Vainonen)

==== Tatarstan state opera and ballet theatre ====
- Odetta-Odilia "Swan lake" (by Petipa, Ivanov),
- Giselle “Giselle” by M.Petipa
- Marie “Nutcracker” ( by V.Vainonen),
- Phrigiya “Spartacus” (by E.Koftun),
- Nikiya “La Bayadère” (by M.Petipa) with Kim In Kim (the principal of Mariinsky Theatre)

==== Mikhailovsky Theatre, Sankt Peterburg ====
- Giselle “Giselle” (by Perro, Koralli, Petipa),
- Kitri “Don Kixot” (by Gorsky, Petipa) with Leonid Sarafanov,
- Marie “Nutcracker” (by Boyarchikov),

==== Stanislavskyi and Nemirovich-Danchenko Moscow Academic Music Theatre ====
- Marie ("The Nutcracker", choreography by V. Vainonen),
- Nikiya ("La Bayadere", choreography by N. Makarova) with Ivan Vasiliev,
- Manon (“Manon”, choreography by K. McMillan),
- Mary Vetsera (“Mayerling”, choreography by K. McMillan) with Sergei Polunin,
- La Sylphide (“La Sylphide”, choreography by P. Lacotte),
- Olga (“Tatiana”, choreography by J. Neumeier),
- Cinderella ("Cinderella", choreography by O. Vinogradov),
- Soloist (“Wings of Wax” and “Petite Mort” in choreography by J.Kylian),
- Snow Maiden "The Snow Maiden"(by Burmeister),
- First duet "In the night" (by Jerome Robbins).

==== Dutch National Ballet ====
- “Giselle” (Giselle) by R.Beaujean after M.Petipa,
- Clara “Nutchracker” (choreography by Wayne Eagling –Tour Van Shayek),
- “Violine concerto” (2nd Area soloist) by G. Balanchine,
- “Theme and variation” (Main soloist) by G. Balanchine,
- “Apollo” (Terpsichore and Calliope) by G. Balanchine,
- "La Bayadere" (Nikiya) by N. Makarova,
- “Metaforen” (soloist) by Hans van Manen,
- 1st Pas de deux in “Adagio Hammerklavier” by Hans van Manen,
- 3rd Pas de deux "Vier letzte lieder" By Rudi van Dantzig,
- “Penumbra” By Remi Wortmeyer,
- “You before me” R.Wortmeyer
- Swanilda “Coppélia” by Ted Brandsen,
- Soloist “Concerto Concordia”, “Cinderella” by Christopher Wheeldon,
- Soloist “Souvenir d’un lieu cher” by Alexei Ratmansky,
- Tatjana “Onegin” by Cranko,
- Nikia “La Bayadere” A.Ratmansky (Berlin Staatsballet 2018),
- “5 Tangos” by H. van Manen,
- “Troix gnossienne” H. van Manen,
- “Replay” by Ted Brandsen,
- “Mata Hari” ( Mata Hari) by Ted Brandsen
- “Manon” ( Manon) K. McMillan

==== Semperoper Dresden ====
- “Yugen” McGregor,
- “Vertiginous the thrill of exactitude” by W. Forsythe,
- “Swan Lake” by R.van Danzig (Odette-Odile),
- “Sleeping beauty” by sir P.Wright (Aurora),
- Pas de deux “Le Corsaire” M.Petipa,
- Pas de deux “Esmeralda” by Beryozov,
- “Tristan + Isolde” (Isolde) by D.Dawson,
- “Metamorphosis” N1 by D.Dawson,
- “On the nature of daylight” by D.Dawson,
- “Messa da Requiem” by C.Spuck,
- “Paquita” by R.Beaujean,
- “Don Quixote” (Kitry) by A.Ratmansky,
- “Dancers at the gathering” by J.Robbins,
- “Who cares ?” (fascinating) by G.Balanchine,
- “Embers” by E.Meisner,
- “After the Rain” by C.Wheeldon

=== Competitions ===
- Grand prix Galina Ulanova ( 2008 Krasnoyarsk), Gold medal
- “Arabesque-2010” ballet competition in Perm, Russia, Gold medal
- “Miss-virtuosity” Danceopen festival Saint Petersburg 2018
- “Dancer of a year” 2018, Dance magazine
