= Jacopo Tissi =

Italian ballet dancer (born 1995)

- Born: 13 February 1995 (age 30); Landriano, Italy
- Education: La Scala Theatre Ballet School
- Occupation: ballet dancer
- Years active: 2014–present
- Career
- Current group: Dutch National Ballet
- Former groups: Bolshoi Ballet; La Scala Theatre Ballet; Vienna State Ballet

Jacopo Tissi (born 13 February 1995) is an Italian ballet dancer. After stints at Vienna State Ballet and La Scala Theatre Ballet in Milan during his early career, he moved to Moscow to join the Bolshoi Ballet in 2016. He was named a principal dancer in December 2021, becoming one of the few foreigners to reach this position in the company's history, but left in March 2022 over the Russian invasion of Ukraine. He returned to La Scala in the 2022–23 season as a guest principal dancer, before joining the Dutch National Ballet in 2023.

== Early life and training ==
Tissi was born in Landriano, Province of Pavia. He began dancing at age five, after seeing a ballet on television, at a new ballet school in his hometown. He entered La Scala Theatre Ballet School in Milan when he was ten. In 2013, he was one of the students from several ballet schools to perform at Grand Kremlin Palace, Moscow, for the 100th anniversary celebration of Bolshoi Ballet School. He graduated in 2014, after eight years of training.

== Career ==
In 2014, upon graduating, the 18-year-old Tissi joined the Vienna State Ballet at the invitation of Manuel Legris, and rejected an offer from La Scala Theatre Ballet. The following year, La Scala invited him to join the company again, and he decided to return to Milan. Soon, he portrayed Prince Desiré in The Sleeping Beauty, partnering Svetlana Zakharova, as both David Hallberg and his substitute Sergei Polunin were injured. He also danced as Espada in Don Quixote, Des Grieux in MacMillan's Manon and Prince Charming in Bigonzetti's Cinderella. He worked with company director Makhar Vaziev closely until he left the company in 2016.

In 2016, he joined the Bolshoi Ballet, after being recruited by Vaziev, who went on to lead the Bolshoi. He is the first Italian member of the company, and one of the few dancers from outside of the post-Soviet states. Within his first year, he was given lead roles in Fokine's Le Spectre de la rose, Lander's Études and Balanchine's "Diamonds" from Jewels, which he performed in New York for the ballet's 50th anniversary celebration that featured dancers from Bolshoi, New York City Ballet and Paris Opera Ballet.

Tissi was promoted to first soloist in November 2017, then leading soloist in 2018, and danced lead roles in Swan Lake, La Bayadère, Raymonda, Vainonen's Flames of Paris and Gsovsky's Grand Pas Classique. In 2019, he danced in MacMillan's Romeo and Juliet at the Royal Ballet alongside Marianela Núñez as a guest artist, after Núñez's partner in the ballet got injured, and he had only two weeks to learn the role. He also took part in Zakharova's tour, during which he danced in Bigonzetti's Caravaggio, Come un Respiro, and as Boy Capel in Possokhov's Gabrielle Chanel.

On New Year's Eve 2021, following a performance of Grigorovich's The Nutcracker, Tissi was promoted to principal dancer at the Bolshoi Ballet, becoming one of the few foreigners to reach this position in the company's history. He then danced "Diamonds" from Jewels for the company's cinema season, as well as in Raymonda and Swan Lake, and made a guest appearance at La Scala to perform La Bayadère, replacing a dancer who tested positive for COVID-19.

On 7 March 2022, Tissi announced on Instagram that he was leaving Bolshoi due to the Russian invasion of Ukraine, which he denounced. Dario Franceschini, the Italian minister of culture, called the move a "brave and noble choice". Later that month, he appeared in a gala benefit for Ukrainian artists and refugees at Teatro degli Arcimboldi, Milan. In May, Tissi appeared at Rome Opera Ballet as a guest artist, dancing as Conrad in Le Corsaire.

Tissi returned to La Scala Theatre Ballet as a guest principal dancer during the 2022–23 season, as announced in late March 2022. He said the opportunity came about when he reached out to La Scala about taking classes soon after leaving Moscow, and days later, he was offered the position by Manuel Legris, now the director of the company. The arrangement allowed Tissi to perform in several production throughout the season, along with guest appearances elsewhere. His first appearance at La Scala as a guest principal was as Albrecht in Giselle in July.

In August 2023, Tissi joined the Dutch National Ballet as principal dancer.
