= Victor Caixeta =

Brazilian ballet dancer

Victor Caixeta is a Brazilian ballet dancer and former soloist with the Mariinsky Ballet and the Dutch National Ballet. He is currently a principal dancer with Vienna State Ballet.

He has danced at venues across Europe, USA and Asia.

== Biography ==
Born in Uberlandia, Brazil, Caixeta began his ballet studies at the age of 12 at a social project called Pé de Moleque.

After winning scholarships at Youth American Grand Prix and Prix de Lausanne, Caixeta finished his studies in 2017 at Staatliche Ballettschule Berlin and performed at the Moscow International Ballet Competition, where he was scouted to become the first Brazilian to join the Mariinsky Ballet. He was promoted to the rank of soloist in 2019.

In 2022, following the conflict between Russia and Ukraine, Caixeta left Mariinsky. He and Russian ballerina Olga Smirnova joined the Dutch National Ballet in March 2022. He was promoted to principal dancer in 2023, after his performance of Siegfried in Swan Lake.

Caixeta and Smirnova performed together for at the 50th anniversary Gala of the Prix de Lausanne and in a new production of La Bayadère by Benjamin Pech at Teatro dell'Opera di Roma.
