= Milena Sidorova =

Choreographer and former ballet dancer

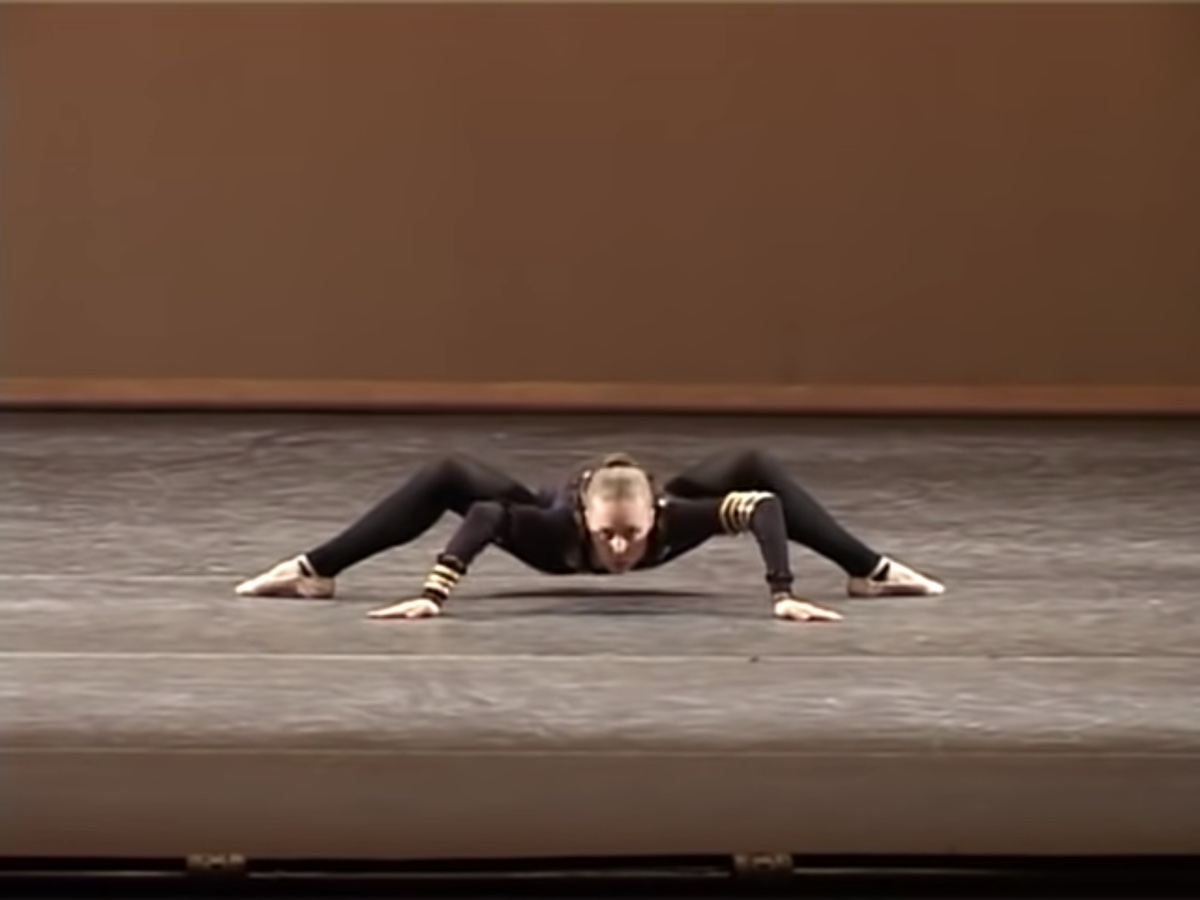
- The Spider by Milena Sidorova (2004)
- Born: December 13, 1986 (age 39); Kyiv, Ukrainian SSR, Soviet Union
- Citizenship: Dutch
- Education: Royal Ballet School
- Occupations: Ballet dancer and choreographer
- Years active: 2005–present
- Career
- Current group: Dutch National Ballet

Milena Sidorova (born December 13, 1986) is a Ukrainian-Dutch choreographer, mostly known for her choreography The Spider and a role as human spider in the 2021 science fiction film Dune. She is a former ballet dancer and currently creates choreographies as a Young Creative Associate with the Dutch National Ballet.

== Education and dance career ==
Born in Kyiv, Sidorova started dancing at the age of three. She received her early training at the Kyiv State Ballet School and graduated with honours from the Royal Ballet School, where she was trained in dance and choreography.

Competing in international dance competitions with her own choreographies, Sidorova won third prize at the Moscow International Ballet competition and first prize at the International Youth Ballet Festival in Kyiv. In 2002, she won the prestigious Prix de Lausanne and the Audience Favourite Award at the same competition. For her contribution to the arts and culture of Ukraine, she received the Ukrainian ‘Person of the Year’ award.

In 2005, Sidorova joined the Dutch National Ballet, where she danced as a grand sujet (soloist) since 2013. She has worked with many prominent choreographers, including David Dawson, Christopher Wheeldon, Alexei Ratmansky, Hans van Manen, William Forsythe, Krzysztof Pastor, Shen Wei and Sidi Larbi Cherkaoui.

== Choreographic career ==
Milena Sidorova is mostly known for The Spider, a short choreography she created at the age of 13. Set to Antira’s Dance by Edvard Grieg, the work mimics the movement of a spider and requires an exceptional flexibility of the hips. The choreography has been widely shared on social media and received more than 15 million views on YouTube alone.

More recently, her choreographies A.I. and SAND (2018) premiered at Dutch National Ballet and were selected for International Draft Works 2019 at the Royal Opera House. She received two Critics' Choice awards by Dance Europe magazine: New Name to Watch (2018) and Best Premiere (2019). In New York, she created a new duet as part of a fellowship for women leaders in dance at The Center for Ballet and the Arts (NYU).

In 2019, she also created a choreography for Tickle (Dutch: Kriebel), a production for young children by theater group Oorkaan, Dutch National Opera and Philharmonie Luxembourg. In 2020, the work received the international YAM Award with specific praise for the "many nice ideas and great movements" while the artists "are so skillful in all areas, movements, navigating the stage and communicating".

During the first Dutch corona lockdown of 2020, Sidorova created Hold On, set to a number of the same name by Dutch rock band Di-rect. The video, created using Zoom and filmed by dancers of the Dutch National Ballet in their homes, went viral and has now more than 100,000 views on YouTube. In September, she created the widely praised group work Reset. Shortly after, Dutch National Ballet appointed her as a Young Creative Associate. It is the first time in the history of the company that an active dancer receives an official appointment as a choreographer.

== Works ==
Sidorova has created 25+ choreographies, mostly for Dutch National Ballet and its Junior Company.

- Regnum (2022)
- Bloom (2022)
- Rose (2021)
- Reset (2020)
- Hold On (2020)
- Tickle (Dutch: Kriebel, 2019)
- A.I. (2018)
- SAND (2018)
- Withdrawn (2017)
- Number 9, Waltz-ish (2016)
- Number 8, Waltz-ish (2015)
- 3D Tango (2015)
- Number 6, Waltz-ish (2015)
- Sinners' ball (2014)
- Duet for her... (2014)
- Number 10, Waltz-ish (2014)
- Subvocal (2011)
- Maria y Angela Malagueña (2011)
- Without and with out (2010)
- Etude for the left leg (2009)
- Kostadinka (2008)
- The Naked Truth (2006, adapted for duo)
- Reality conundrum (2004)
- The Naked Truth (2001)
- Full Moon (2001)
- The Spider (2000)

=== Film ===
Year	Title	Role	Notes
2021	Dune	Human Spider Proxy	
