= Olga Esina =

Russian ballerina

- Ольга Есина
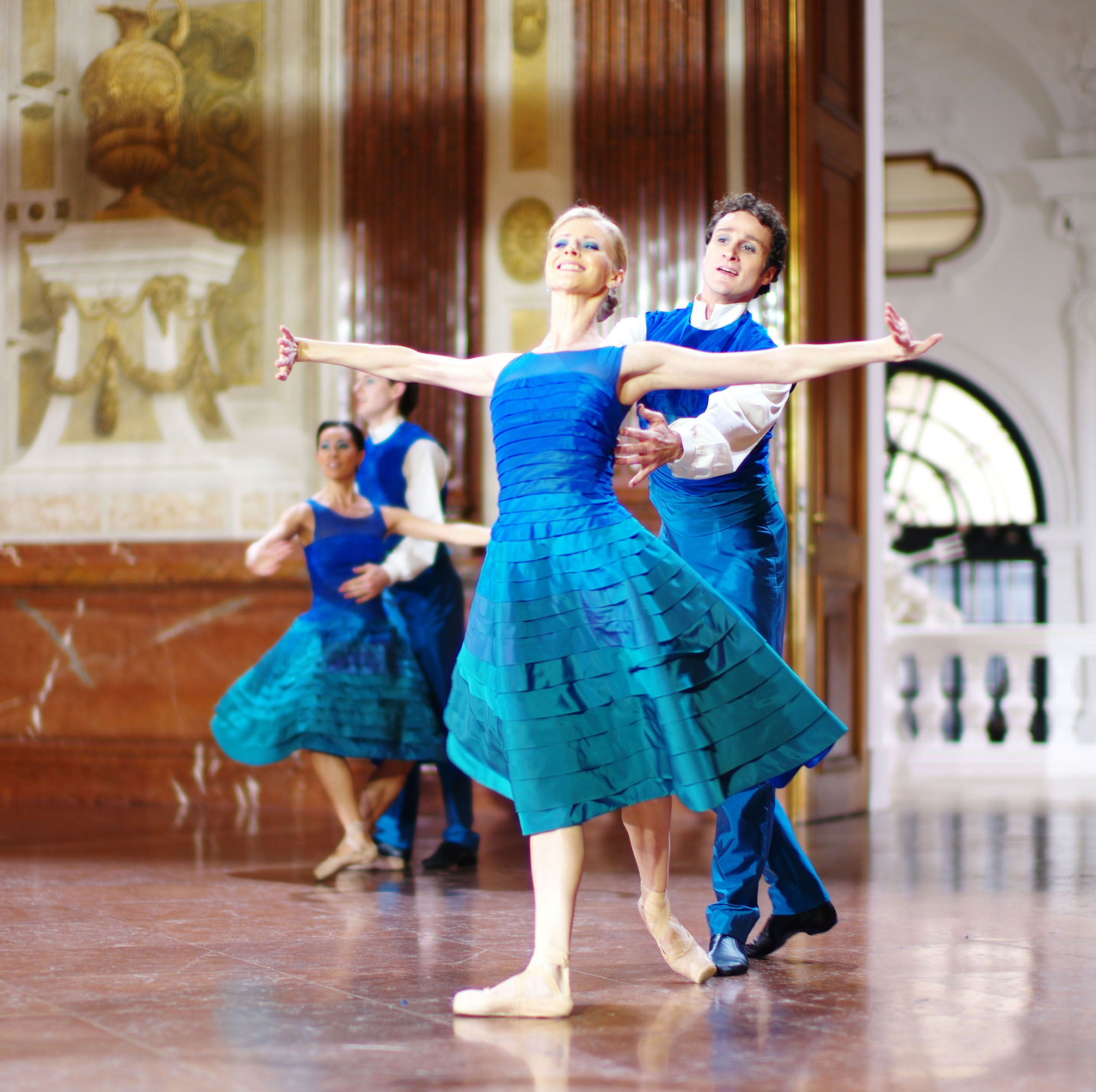
- Esina and Roman Lazik in 2011
- Born: 1986 (age 39–40); Leningrad, RSFSR, USSR
- Education: Vaganova Academy of Russian Ballet
- Occupation: Ballet dancer
- Employer: Vienna State Ballet
- Known for: classical and modern ballet

Olga Esina (Ольга Есина) is a Russian ballerina who was educated at the Vaganova Academy of Russian Ballet in Saint Petersburg, Russia. In 2010, she became a First Solo Dancer at the Vienna State Ballet.

== Early life ==
She was born in 1986 at St. Petersburg, Russia. At the age of five she began to study ballet. In 1996 at the age of 10 she entered the Vaganova Academy of Russian Ballet, where she studied dance from 1996 to 2004. Her first teachers at the Academy were D. Lebedeva, N. Alexandrova, V. Tsiruliova and later L. Kovaliova.

While studying at the senior forms she participated in school recitals with variations from Raymonda, Le Corsaire, and La Bayadère, Pas de deux from Giselle and Le Corsaire, and miniatures by Roland Petit and Jacobson. From 2004 to 2006 she was a member of the Ballet of the Mariinsky Theatre. Olga Moiseeva was her teacher at the theatre.

== Dancing at the Vienna State Ballet ==
In 2006 she joined as a principal dancer of the Ballet of the Vienna State Opera and Volksoper, and in 2010 she was appointed as the first solo dancer of the Vienna State Ballet.

Among her most important roles at the Mariinsky Theatre included Odette/Odile in Swan Lake, Queen of the Dryads in Don Quixote, and Lilac Fairy in The Sleeping Beauty as well as roles in George Balanchine's Apollo, The Four Temperaments and La Valse. She also performed at the Vienna Opera Ball, 2010 and 2012.

== Awards ==
Esina was nominated for the Prix Benois de la Danse in 2006, the Prix International in 2008, the Prix Benois de la Danse in 2012 and the Taglioni Award (Berlin) in 2014.

== Main roles ==
At the Vienna State Ballet:

- Odette/Odile in Rudolf Nureyev's Swan Lake
- Swanilda in Coppelia directed by Gyula Harangozó
- Princess Mary in Gyula Harangozó's The Nutcracker,
- Myrtha in Elena Tschernischova's Giselle
- Queen of the Dryads in Rudolf Nureyev's Don Quixote
- Hamsatti in Vladimir Malakhov's La Bayadère
- Bella in Roland Petit's Die Fledermaus
- Ada in Maurice Béjart's Le Concours
- Juliet in John Cranko's Romeo and Juliet
- The title roles in Kenneth MacMillan's Manon and Boris Eifman's Anna Karenina
- Prima Donna in Promenade Concert by Gyula Harangozó
- Leading roles in Marius Petipa's Grand Pas from Paquita
- George Balanchine's Theme and Variations
- Jerome Robbins' In the Night and Glass Pieces
- John Neumeier's Bach Suite III
- Jorma Elo's Glow - Stop
- William Forsythe's Slingerland pas de deux
- Pas de deux from Roland Petit's Notre-Dame de Paris
- In Jorma Elo's A Midsummer Night's Dream, she created the role of Titania
- Patrick de Bana Marie Antoinette in the title role
- Vienna New Year's Concert: Donauwalzer, choreographed by Davide Bombana

She has made guest appearances in Hungary, France, Argentina, Italy, Russia, Germany and England.

== DVD - Blu-ray ==
- Rudolf Nureyev's Swan Lake - Studio: C Major Entertainment - Release Date: October 28, 2014 - ASIN: B00NCZ97T0 (Blu-ray ASIN: B00NG4B6L4)

 Actors: Wiener Staatsballett, Olga Esina, Alexander Ingram, Dagmar Kronberger, Vladimir Shishov
 Directors: Michael Beyer
