= Berlanga =

Berlanga may refer to:

== People ==
- Carlos Berlanga (1959–2002), Spanish musician, composer and painter
- Consuelo Berlanga (born 1955), Spanish journalist
- Edgar Berlanga (born 1997), American professional boxer
- Esteban Berlanga, Spanish ballet dancer
- Fray Tomás de Berlanga (1487–1551), fourth bishop of Panama, reportedly the first European to discover the Galápagos Islands
- Luis García Berlanga (1921–2010), Spanish film director and screenwriter

== Places ==
- Berlanga, Badajoz, a municipality in the province of Badajoz, Extremadura, Spain
- Berlanga de Duero, a municipality located in the province of Soria, Castile and León, Spain
- Berlanga del Bierzo, a municipality located in the province of León, Castile and León, Spain
- San Baudelio de Berlanga, an early 11th-century church situated at Caltojar, province of Soria, Spain, 80 km south of Berlanga de Duero
