= National Dance Awards 2009 =

The National Dance Awards 2009, were organised by The Critics' Circle, and presented to recognise excellence in professional dance in the United Kingdom. The ceremony was held in the Paul Hamlyn Hall of the Royal Opera House, London, on 21 January 2010, with awards given for productions staged in the previous year. The awards were sponsored by Yvonne Sherrington in memory of her husband Richard Sherrington, the founder sponsor of the Awards; HIT Entertainment; The Dancing Times; Dance Europe; Dance UK; Artsworld Presentations; The Council for Dance Education and Training and the website ballet.co.uk

== Awards presented ==
=== De Valois Award for Outstanding Achievement ===
- Alexander Grant, former Principal dancer of the Royal Ballet and artistic director of the National Ballet of Canada

=== Patron's Award ===
- Richard Bonynge, international conductor

=== Dance UK Industry Award ===
- Marie McCluskey, artistic director of Swindon Dance

=== Dancing Times Award for Best Male Dancer ===
- Paul Liburd, of the Scottish Ballet - WINNER

- Federico Bonelli, of the Royal Ballet
- Colin Dunne, freelance artist

=== Richard Sherrington Award for Best Female Dancer ===
- Leanne Benjamin, of the Royal Ballet - WINNER

- Elena Glurdjidze, of the English National Ballet
- Daria Klimentová, of the English National Ballet

=== Dance Europe Award for Outstanding Company ===
- Ballet Black - WINNER

- Morphoses | The Wheeldon Company
- Scottish Ballet

=== Best Classical Choreography ===
- Wayne McGregor, for Infra for the Royal Ballet - WINNER

- David Dawson, for Faun(e) for English National Ballet
- Liam Scarlett, for Consolations and Liebestraum for the Royal Ballet

=== Best Modern Choreography ===
- Christopher Bruce, for Hush for the Rambert Dance Company - WINNER

- Itzik Galili, for A Linha Curva for the Rambert Dance Company
- Lloyd Newson and DV8 dancers, for To Be Straight With You for DV8 Physical Theatre

=== PMB Presentations Award for Best Foreign Dance Company ===
- Merce Cunningham Dance Company, United States of America - WINNER

- The Forsythe Company, Germany
- Royal Ballet of Flanders, Belgium

=== Outstanding Female Performance (Classical) ===
- Melissa Hamilton, of the Royal Ballet - WINNER

- Martina Forioso, of the Scottish Ballet
- Sarah Kundi, of Ballet Black

=== Outstanding Male Performance (Classical) ===
- Sergei Polunin, of the Royal Ballet - WINNER

- Tobias Batley, of Northern Ballet Theatre
- Esteban Berlanga, of the English National Ballet

=== Outstanding Female Performance (Modern) ===
- Amy Hollingsworth, freelance artist - WINNER

- Malgorzata Dzierzon, of the Rambert Dance Company
- Sally Marie, freelance artist

=== Outstanding Male Performance (Modern) ===
- Thomasin Gülgeç, of the Rambert Dance Company - WINNER

- Robin Dingemans, a freelance artist
- Dominic North, of New Adventures

== Special awards ==
Two new awards for young people were given: the Angelina Ballerina Children's Award sponsored by HIT Entertainment and the Council for Dance Education and Training award for student of the year at one of the CDETs accredited professional dance schools.

=== Angelina Ballerina Children's Award ===
- Lucy Wood, of the Susan Robinson School of Dance

=== CDET Student of the Year Award ===
- Sam Chung, of the Tring Park School for the Performing Arts
