= Esteban Berlanga =

Spanish ballet dancer

- Born: Esteban Berlanga; 17 March; Albacete, Spain
- Education: Conservatorio Profesional de Musica y Danza de Albacete, Real Conservatorio Profesional de Danza de Madrid
- Known for: Ballet
- Awards: Castilla–La Mancha competition, 2006, Classical Male Spotlight Nominee (2008), Emerging Dancer Nominee (2009)

Esteban Berlanga is a Spanish ballet dancer and a principal dancer with the Compañía Nacional de Danza, Madrid.

== Biography ==
Esteban Berlanga was born in Motilleja, a village of 600 inhabitants near Albacete, Spain. He initially wanted to become a flamenco dancer as he did not know what classical ballet was at the time. He started his training at the Conservatorio Profesional de Musica y Danza de Albacete at the age of 9. At the age of 16, he moved on to the Real Conservatorio Profesional de Danza de Madrid to continue his studies, before joining the corps de ballet of Europa Danse in 2003.

== Career ==
=== English National Ballet ===
Berlanga joined the English National Ballet after winning the 2006 Castilla-La Mancha competition, having been part of Europa Danse for two years prior to leaving in 2005. He was promoted by the company to First Artist in 2007 and to Soloist two years later.

During his tenure with the company, his repertoire has included main roles in Swan Lake (he debuted as Prince Siegfried in January 2008 while still an Artist of the Company and was part of the 'in-the-round' production created specially for the Royal Albert Hall), Ben Stevenson's Three Preludes, David Dawson’s A Million Kisses to my Skin, Les Sylphides (The Poet), Manon (Des Grieux), Sleeping Beauty (Prince Désiré),Giselle (Albrecht), Cinderella (Prince), Roland Petit's L'Arlésienne (Frédéri), Serge Lifar's Suite en Blanc (Pas de Deux), Strictly Gershwin (An American in Paris, It Ain’t Necessarily So) and Wayne Eagling's The Nutcracker (Prince).

He also guested with the Australian Ballet in 2011 for their Madama Butterfly production as Pinkerton.

Berlanga has created roles in Goyo Montero's El Día de la Creación and most recently, David Dawson’s Faun(e) for which he was awarded a Prix Benois de la Danse in 2010.

He was promoted to First Soloist in January 2012.

=== Compañía Nacional de Danza ===
In 2013 Esteban joined the Compañía Nacional de Danza, Madrid as a principal dancer (bailarín principal).

== Awards ==
- First prize, Castilla-La Mancha dance competition (2006).
- Classical Male Spotlight award nominee at the Critics’ Circle National Dance Awards (2008).
- National Dance Awards, Outstanding Male Performance (Classical) (2009).
- Emerging Dancer Award Nominee (2009).
- Prix Benois de la Danse, Male Dancer, Faun(e) (2010).
- National Dance Awards nomination, Outstanding Male Performance (Classical) (2011).

== Reviews ==
Giselle/Men Y Men, The Stage, 29 October 2009 : " Yet with... ...Esteban Berlanga as Albrecht, nominated for this year’s ENB Emerging Dancer Award, it is also a production that is sprinkled with just a touch more magic dust. Both are sublime in their poise and grace."

Ballets Russes [Programme 2], ClassicalSource.com, 20 June 2009 : " This matinée performance saw several role debuts, including Esteban Berlanga’s ardent poet. The young artist is impressive already and is maturing into a dancer of the first order; Berlanga is one of the company’s great hopes, and already he commands the stage with a fine technique and noble presence."
