= Venera Gimadieva =

Russian operatic soprano (born 1984)

- Венера Фаритовна Гимадиева
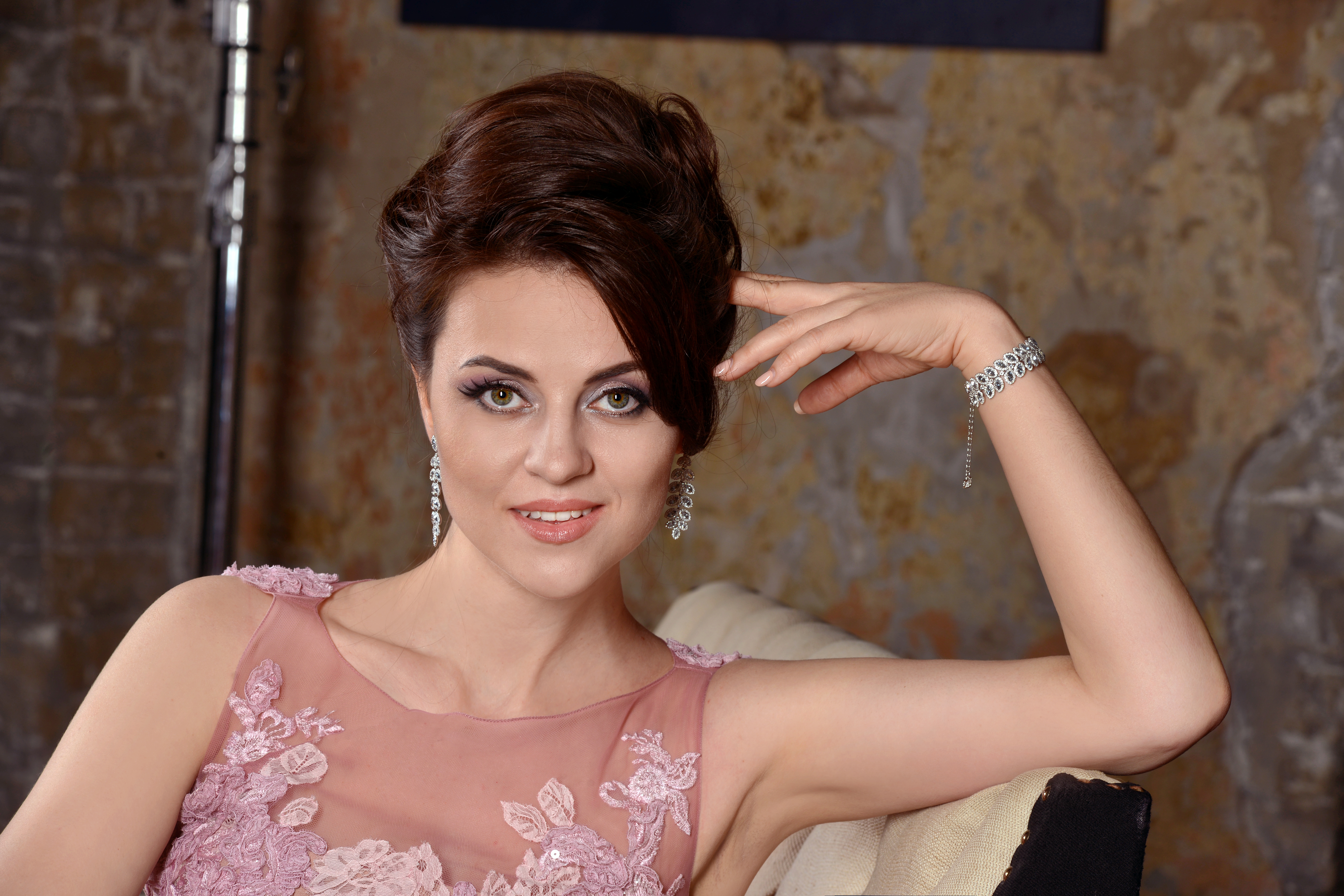
- Born: 28 May 1984 (age 41); Kazan, Soviet Russia, USSR
- Occupation: Opera singer (soprano)
- Awards: International Shalyapin Competition, First Prize (2010); Golden Mask, the Best Female Role in Opera (La sonnambula)(2014); Paris Opera Competition, Second Prize (2015); Prize of the President of the Russian Federation for Young Cultural Figures
- Website: www.venera-gimadieva.com

Venera Faritovna Gimadieva (Russian: Венера Фаритовна Гимадиева; born 28 May 1984) is a Russian operatic soprano. She is invited to opera houses around the world as one of the leading lyric coloratura sopranos of her generation.

== Early life and training ==
Venera was born in Kazan in Tatarstan to the family of a teacher and a military officer.

In 2008-2009 she was the soloists of St Petersburg Opera.

== Career ==
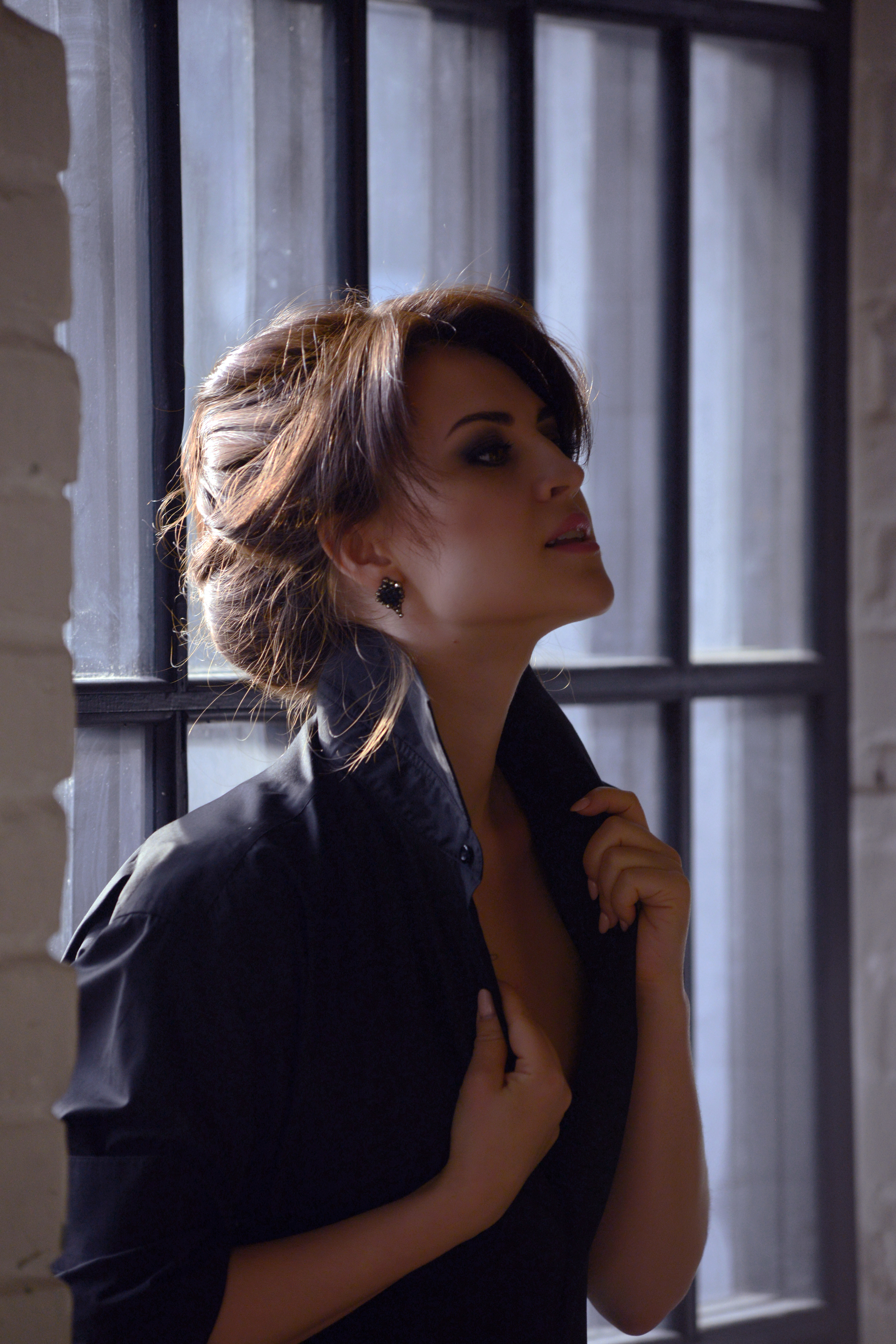

Venera Gimadieva joined the Bolshoi Theatre as a soloist in 2011. Her roles at the Bolshoi have included Gilda Rigoletto, Marfa The Tsar’s Bride, Ksenia Boris Godunov, Amina in a new production of La sonnambula, Violetta in a new production of La traviata by Francesca Zambello, the title role of Rimsky-Korsakov’s The Snow Maiden, the Queen of Shemakha in a new production of The Golden Cockerel by Kirill Serebrennikov and conducted by Vassily Sinaisky, Sirin in Rimsky-Korsakov's The Legend of the Invisible City of Kitezh and Maiden Fevronia, and Serpina in Pergolesi's La serva padrona. Concert performances in Moscow include Brahms's Ein Deutsches Requiem with the Russian National Orchestra conducted by Mikhail Pletnev at the Tchaikovsky Concert Hall.

She has performed the role of Violetta in Verdi's La traviata at opera houses in France, Germany and Italy, including for her debut at La Fenice, Venice. She sang Violetta for her debut at Glyndebourne Festival Opera in July 2014, in Tom Cairns's production conducted by sir Mark Elder. This critically acclaimed appearance followed her successful UK debut at the 2013 BBC Proms, when she sang with the John Wilson Orchestra in a televised performance. Roles in 2013–2014 season also included Venera's first Juliette in Gounod’s Roméo et Juliette opposite Juan Diego Flórez’s first Roméo in Lima, Peru, and the title roles of Lucia di Lammermoor and Manon.

The 2015–16 season saw Gimadieva sing Violetta for both her debut at the Royal Opera House, Covent Garden, and her USA debut at the Hollywood Bowl with the LA Philharmonic Orchestra. She also sings the title role of Lucia di Lammermoor in Limoges, Rheims and Rouen; Giulietta in I Capuleti e i Montecchi at the Deutsche Oper Berlin; and Elvira in I puritani at the Teatro Real Madrid, where she also sang Violetta in the acclaimed David McVicar's production of La traviata.

The 2016–17 season had three more debuts for Venera; La Monnaie in Brussels, Zürich Opera House, and Santa Fe Opera. In Brussels, she performed the role of Queen of Shemakha, which was released on video by BelAir Classique in 2018. In February, she played Lucia in Lucia di Lammermoor at the Zurich Opera House. Finally, during the summer festival at the Santa Fe Opera, she was once again the Queen of Shemakha in a new production of The Golden Cockerel.

The 2017–18 season began with a recital at the Edinburgh International Festival where Venera performed a selection of Russian songs by Tchaikovsky, Rachmaninoff, Rimsky-Korsakov, Glière, Vlasov and Vasilenko, accompanied by Pavel Nebolsin. While in Scotland, she also worked on a video clip for Smoke, a musical composition written by Ola Gjeilo based on a poem by Henry David Thoreau. The debut of the season was a concert performance of The Golden Cockerel at Amsterdam's Concertgebouw. Next, she performed the role of Elvira (I puritani) at the Vienna State Opera. The 2018 saw the start of a new project for Venera as she recorded her first solo CD, Momento Immobile, with The Hallé Orchestra conducted by Gianluca Marcianò. In April, London's Wigmore Hall was the site of a second recital with Pavel Nebolsin, where she performed a number of art songs by Russian composers. Venera has joined Roberto Alagna and Aleksandra Kurzak for a Classic Gala Concert at the Palace Square in Saint Petersburg. Throughout the season she has performed Lucia di Lammermoor at Bayerische Staatsoper, Opéra national de Bordeaux, Teatro Real in Madrid, and Semperoper in Dresden. In October Venera enjoyed her debut as Violetta (La traviata) at the Washington National Opera.

== Debuts ==
- 2012 - Hungarian State Opera House (Violetta)
- 2013 - Savonlinna Opera Festival (Violetta); BBC Proms Royal Albert Hall, London
- 2014 - La Fenice, Venice (Violetta); Glyndebourne Festival Opera (Violetta) with Mark Elder; Opéra Bastille, Paris (Violetta); VII Festival Granda, Lima, Peru (Juliette) with Juan Diego Florez
- 2015 - Teatro Real, Madrid (Violetta); Hollywood Bowl, US (Violetta); AIDS Gala Deutsche Oper Berlin
- 2016 - Royal Opera House, London (Violetta); Semperoper Dresden (Violetta); La Monnaie Brussels (Tsariza Shemakha)
- 2017 - Zürich Opera House (Lucia) with Nello Santi; Santa Fe Opera (The Queen of Shemakha); Concertgebouw, Amsterdam (Koningin van Sjemacha)
- 2018 - Wiener Staatsoper (Elvira); Grand Théâtre de Bordeaux (Lucia); Bayerische Staatsoper (Lucia); Washington National Opera (Violetta)

== Recordings and awards ==
- 2009 - Competizione dell’Opera, Dresden
- 2013 - Golden Mask, the Best Female Role in Opera nomination (The Golden Cockerel, Kirill Serebrennikov)
- 2014 - Golden Mask, the Best Female Role in Opera (La sonnambula)
- 2015 - Paris Opera Competition, Second Prize

MOMENTO IMMOBILE, The Hallé, conductor Gianluca Marciano, produced by Artist Digital UK (2018) (CD), Rubicon Classics

VERDI, G.: Traviata (La) (Glyndebourne, 2014) (NTSC), Opus Arte

VERDI, G.: Traviata (La) (Glyndebourne, 2014) (Blu-ray, HD), Opus Arte

RIMSKY-KORSAKOV, N.: The Golden Cockerel (Palais De La Monnaie, 2016) (DVD, Blu-ray), BelAir Classique
