= Olga Smirnova (dancer) =

Russian ballet dancer (born 1991)

- Ольга Смирнова
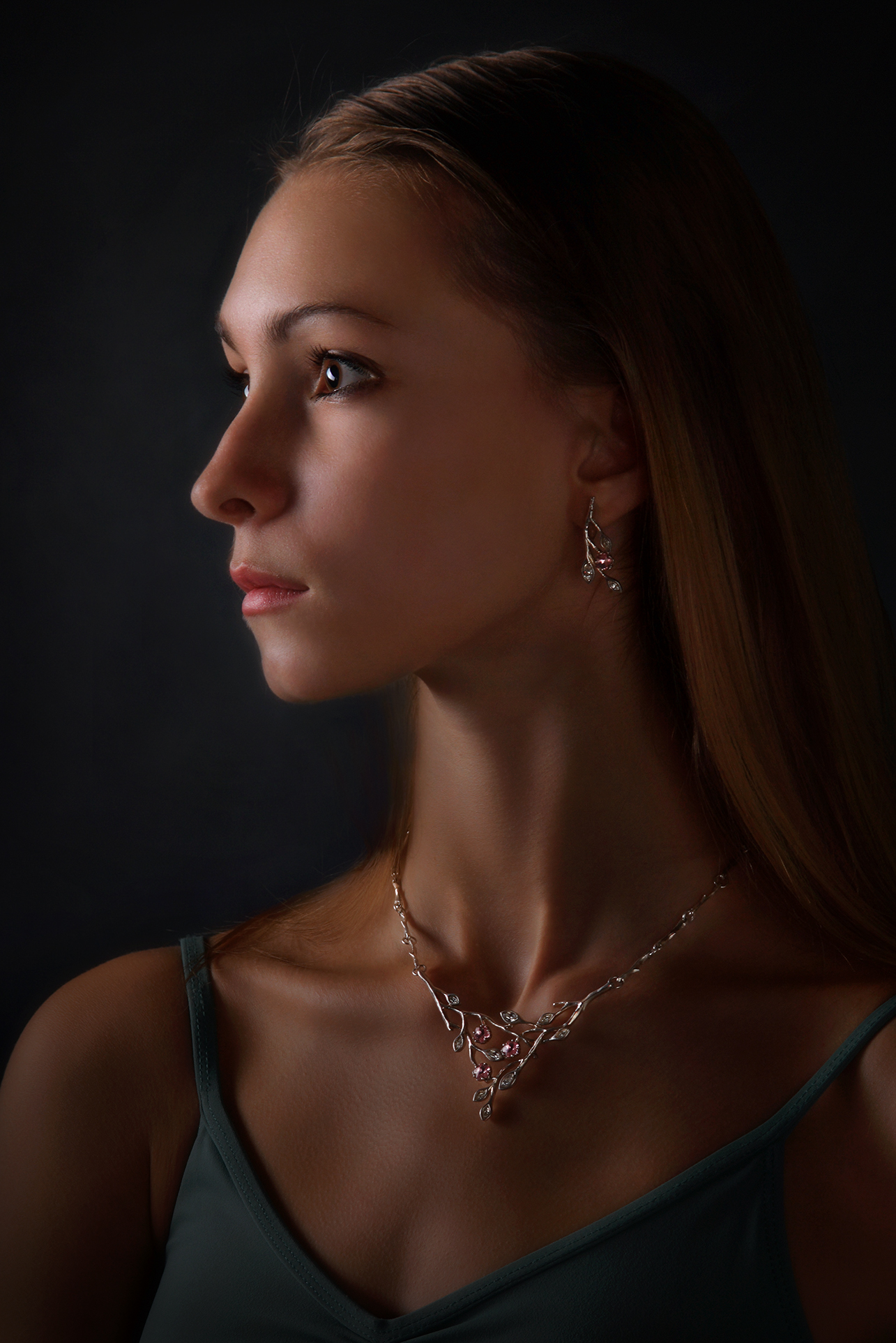
- Smirnova in 2011
- Born: Olga Vyacheslavovna Smirnova; 6 November 1991 (age 34); Saint Petersburg, Russian SFSR, Soviet Union
- Education: Vaganova Academy
- Occupation: Ballerina
- Awards: Prize of the President of the Russian Federation for Young Cultural Figures

Olga Vyacheslavovna Smirnova (Russian: Ольга Вячеславовна Смирнова; born 6 November 1991) is a Russian ballet dancer. Formerly a prima ballerina of the Bolshoi Ballet, Smirnova has been a principal dancer with the Dutch National Ballet in Amsterdam, Netherlands since 2022. She has danced at venues across Europe, as well as performing in China and Japan.

== Biography ==
Born in Saint Petersburg, Smirnova comes from a family with no connections with ballet. Her mother encouraged her to take up the art at the Vaganova Academy where she studied under Lyudmila Kovaleva. She participated in the academy's tours across Europe and Japan, performing in the 2004 presentation arranged jointly with the Royal Ballet School. In 2011, while still a student at the Vaganova academy, Smirnova appeared in London at the London Coliseum to commemorate Galina Ulanova, who is said to be one of the greatest ballerinas. For the commemoration routine, which was choreographed by A. Messerer and accompanied by Dvořák's Melody, Smirnova danced with S. Strelkov. She also danced, in June of that year, at Diana Vishneva's benefit performance at the Mariinsky Theatre. The following month, she was in Beijing, partnered by the Bolshoi's principal dancer Semyon Chudin, performing Grand Pas Classique (choreography by V. Gsovsky) to music by the 19th century French composer Daniel Auber.

In 2011, immediately after her graduation, she was recruited by the Bolshoi Ballet directly in the rank of soloist. She was promoted to first soloist in her first season, to leading soloist at the end of her second season in 2013, and to prima ballerina in 2016. Until 2018, Smirnova worked under the tutelage of the legendary Marina Kondratieva; currently her master tutor at the Bolshoi is Maria Allash.

In 2012 and 2013, she danced leading roles in La Bayadère, Diamonds, The Pharaoh's Daughter and Swan Lake. In 2013, she performed the role of Tatiana at the Bolshoi's premiere of Cranko's Onegin. She has created roles such as Bianca in Mailliot's Taming of the Shrew, Jorma Elo's Dream of Dream, the Marquess in Pierre Lacotte's Marco Spada. Her repertoire also includes Aurora in Sleeping Beauty, Anastasia in Ivan the Terrible, Terpischore in Balanchine's Apollo, and Marguerite in John Neumeier's Lady of the Camellias.

In 2014, she was invited to guest with the American Ballet Theatre as Nikiya in Natalia Makarova's production of La Bayadère. She also danced the principal part in Diamonds, a part which she premiered in 2012, in the Bolshoi's broadcast of Jewels. In 2020 she was awarded the Prize of the President of the Russian Federation for Young Cultural Figures.

In March 2022, she left Russia because of the invasion of Ukraine. Her grandfather was Ukrainian, and she stated she was "against this war with every fibre of my soul". She was quickly hired by the Dutch National Ballet.

== Assessment ==
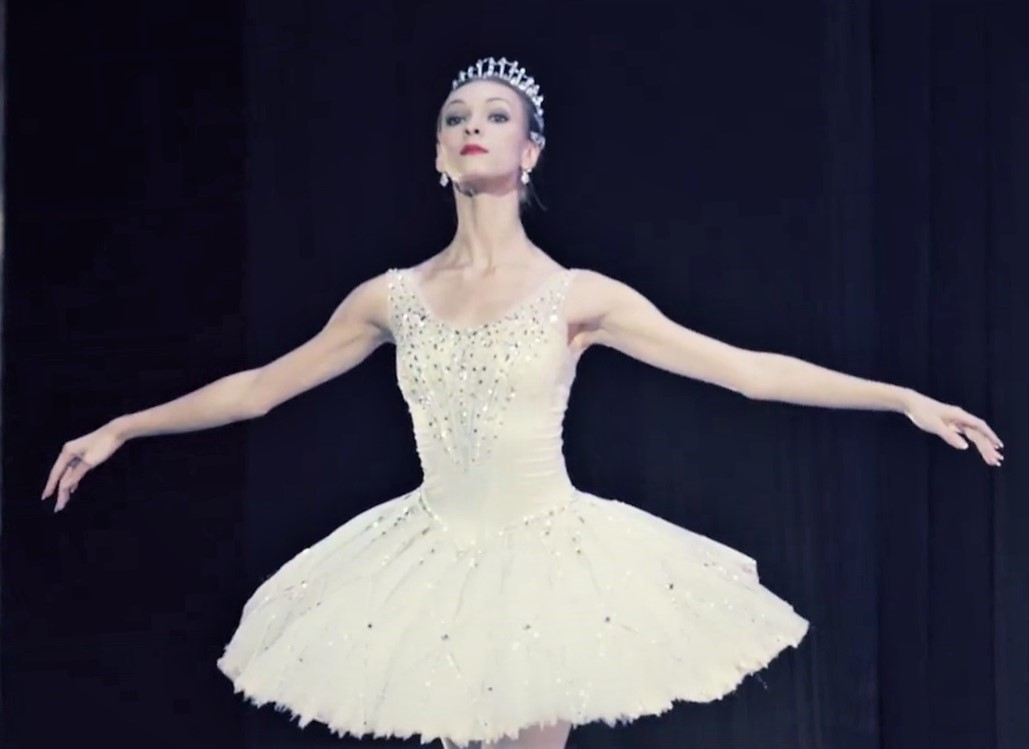
Smirnova in 2019

Writing in The Telegraph in March 2013, Mark Monahan found her "a truly extraordinary talent". He described her physique as: "Long-limbed, with a swan-like neck, superbly pliant spine and ravishing, sway-back classical line, she also has the agility of a soubrette. Her arms ripple with an unmistakably Russian, lighter-than-air lyricism, yet her soaring, apparently preparation-free jump, which heightens the impression of buoyancy, also suggests great muscular strength." As for her dancing skills, he commented that "after barely 18 months, she is already a working definition of a star."

Commenting on her performance in Diamonds (August 2013), Luke Jennings of The Observer characterizes her as "the physically perfect instrument of her art form", revealing his enthusiasm for her pas de deux with Semyon Chudin at the Royal Opera House. He also acclaimed her roles the same week of Odette-Odile in Swan Lake.

The enthusiasm was reflected by Clement Crisp of the Financial Times while Zoë Anderson of The Independent was impressed by her performance of Nikiya in La Bayadère in which she "carried the story with aplomb".
