= Oleg Akkuratov =

Russian musician and singer (born 1989)

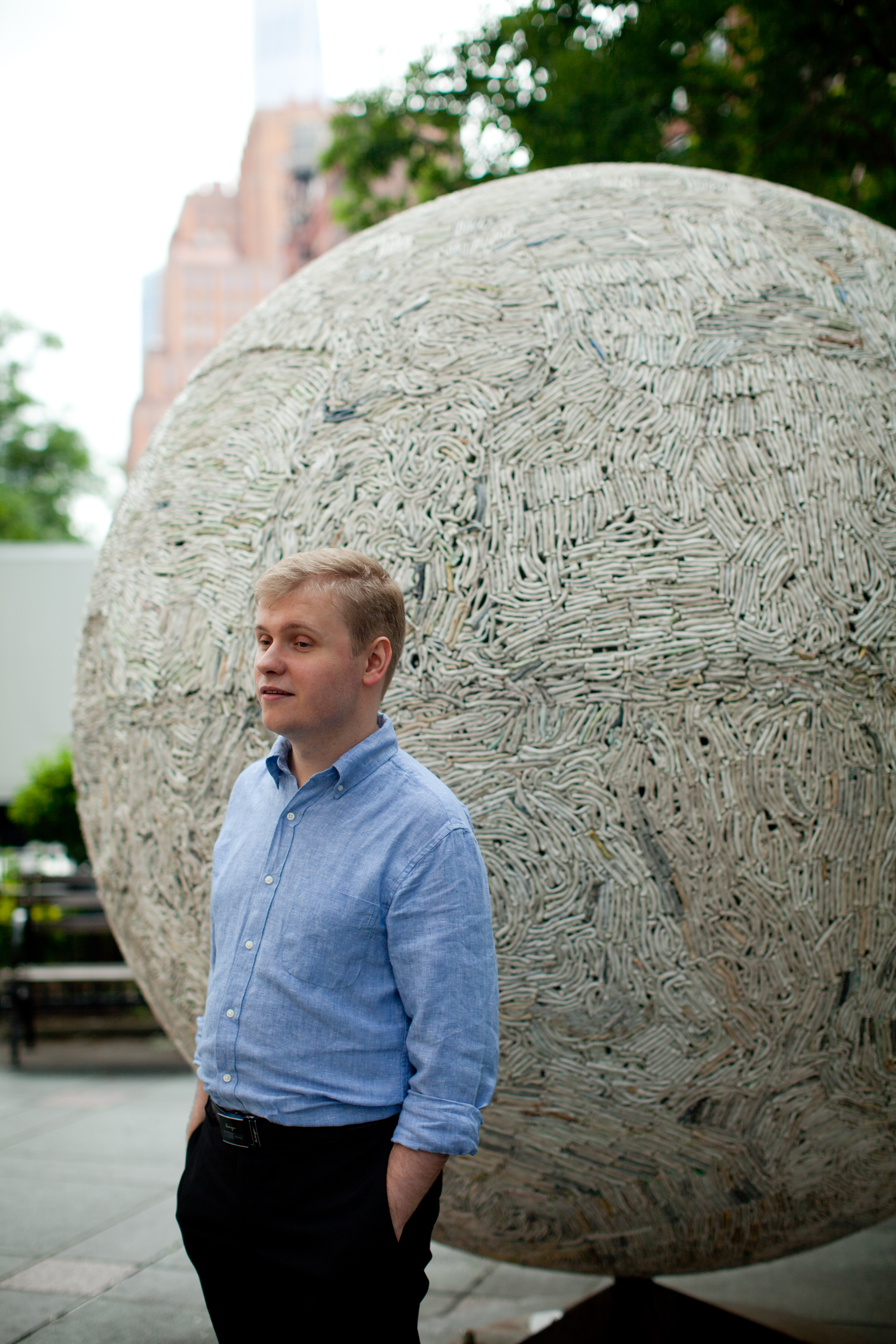

Background information
- Born: Akkuratov Oleg Borisovich; October 21, 1989 (age 31)
- Origin: Yeysk, Yeysk district, Krasnodar region, RSFSR, USSR.
- Genres: jazz, classical music
- Occupations: Vocal; pianist; composer
- Instruments: Vocals, piano
- Years active: 1995–present
- Website: olegakkuratov.com

Oleg Borisovich Akkuratov (Russian: Олег Борисович Аккуратов; born 21 October 1989 in Yeysk, Soviet Union) is a Russian pianist, jazz improviser and singer who has amaurosis – complete blindness. He is a virtuoso performer of jazz and classical works and a laureate of the Prize of the President of the Russian Federation for young cultural workers (2019).

== Biography ==
Akkuratov was born on October 21, 1989, in the city of Yeysk, Krasnodar Krai. Blind from birth, at the age of four, the boy began to show extraordinary musical abilities, playing the melodies he heard on the piano. The teachers of the Yeysk School of Music immediately took the boy to the 1st grade. And two years later he entered a specialized music school for blind and visually impaired children in the city of Armavir, Krasnodar Krai. Later, in parallel with his studies at school, Akkuratov studied at the Moscow State College of Music of Variety and Jazz Art, in the class of teacher Mikhail Okun. Akkuratov entered the pop and jazz department of the Institute of Music of the Moscow State Institute of Culture after graduating from the College of Music in 2008. In 2015, Akkuratov graduated with honors from the Rostov State Conservatory in 2017 – Postgraduate studies in chamber music. During his studies, Akkuratov took part in concerts and became a laureate of various music competitions, including international ones. Previously, he lived in the village of Morevka near Yeysk. He worked as a soloist of the Russian Opera Theater, artistic director and soloist of the Eisk Jazz Orchestra MICH-Band (piano).

Akkuratov took part in a concert with the opera singer Montserrat Caballe, performed with Evelyn Glennie. He took part in the world premiere of the international charitable action "Thousands of Cities of the World", performed at the residence of the Pope as the UNESCO World Consolidated Choir.

Akkuratov plays jazz and classical pieces. He sings in many languages: English, German, French, Spanish, Portuguese, Japanese, Chinese, Korean and others. Lyudmila Gurchenko dedicated her debut directorial work to Akkuratov – the film Colorful Twilight shot in 2009.

November 24, 2009, was the hero of Andrey Malakhov program "Let them talk".

In 2013, Akkuratov began to work closely with People's Artist of Russia Igor Butman. As a member of the Igor Butman Quartet and the Moscow Jazz Orchestra, Akkuratov toured Latvia, Israel, the Netherlands, Italy, India, the US and Canada and many other countries.

In 2013, Akkuratov performed at the Igor Butman festival Triumph of Jazz. In May of the same year, Akkuratov, along with double bass player Keith Davis, drummer Mark Whitfield and saxophonist Francesco Kafiso, took part in Igor Butman's international project "The Future of Jazz" and the projects "Chereshnevy Les" in Moscow, Aquajazz. Sochi Jazz Festival in Sochi.

In March 2014, his performance completed the closing ceremony of the 2014 Winter Paralympics in Sochi.

In April 2015, at the invitation of Winton Marsalis, Akkuratov performed at the Rose Hall of New York's Lincoln Center with the Jazz at Lincoln Center Orchestra. On February 1, 2017, in the Svetlanov Hall of the Moscow International House of Music, Akkuratov's first big solo concert with Igor Butman's participation took place. In October of the same year, Akkuratov, as part of his own trio, performed for several thousand guests of the 19th World Festival of Youth and Students in Sochi.

In 2018, Oleg Akkuratov took part in the Gala Concert of the International Day of Jazz organized by UNESCO, was awarded the Moscow Mayor's Prize, and also took second place at the prestigious Sarah Vaughan International Jazz Vocal Competition, held in the homeland of jazz, in the USA. In 2020 he received the Prize of the President of the Russian Federation for Young Cultural Figures.

== Education ==
- 1996–2009 Armavir State Music School for Blind and Visually Impaired Children. Teacher: Anna Kudryashova
- 2005–2008 State College of Music of Variety and Jazz Art. Teacher: Mikhail Okun
- 2009–2011 Moscow State Institute of Culture. Teacher: Mikhail Okun
- 2011–2015 Rachmaninov Rostov State Conservatory. Teacher: Vladimir Dyche
- 2015–2017 Rachmaninov Rostov State Conservatory, Postgraduate studies. Teacher: Margarita Chernykh

== Competitions and awards ==
Competitions and Awards
Year	Competition	Award
1995	2nd International Louis Braille Competition, which was held at the Moscow Conservatory	Diploma-recipient
2001	Federal Target Program "Gifted Children"	Was on the list of scholars
2002	Regional competition among students of the piano departments of children's music schools and art schools of the Krasnodar Territory	Grand Prix
2002	Regional competitions for young composers of the Kuban "Orpheus"	Laureate
2002	International Philanthropist Prize	Laureate
2002	First Russian Competition of Young Jazz Music Performers in Saratov	Laureate
2003	Fifth All-Russian Competition for Young Pianists named after Konstantin Igumnov in Lipetsk	Laureate
2005	International master classes at the Royal Academy of Music, London	Participant
2005	international festival of arts "Starry Youth of the Planet", which was held at the All-Russian Children's Center "Orlyonok"	Diploma-recipient as the best accompanist of the choir and soloist
2005	John Psazas's most complex Concerto "View from Olympus"	Participant
2006	Russian competition of young performers of jazz music "Royal in Jazz" (Moscow)	Grand Prix in the category "Jazz music performer" and I degree diploma in the category "Composition, arrangement and improvisation"
2006	Regional competition of choirs, vocal soloists and vocal ensembles of students of children's music schools and art schools of the Krasnodar Territory	1st place in a vocal duet
2008	Vera Lotar-Shevchenko International Piano Competition (Novosibirsk)	Winner in the adult category
2010	First All-Russian Music Competition	Diploma winner and special prize-winner "For the will to win, virtuoso performance, talent and hard work."
2012	2nd All-Russian Festival-Competition of Vocal Art "Crystal Voice"	Grand Prix
2014	2nd All-Russian Music Competition	2nd Prize
2018	Nikolai Ostrovsky Moscow Mayor Prize	Winner
2018	Sarah Vaughan International Jazz Vocal Competition (Newark, USA)	2nd place and prize "First Runner Up"
2019	All Colors of Jazz Award	Laureate
2019	Prize of the President of the Russian Federation for young cultural workers	Laureate
2020	The Voice, season 9	Second Place, Runner-up.

== Films about him ==
- The documentaryː «Boy from Armavir. Extraordinary wunderkind », 2007.
- Feature Filmː «Сolorful twilight», 2009.
- The documentaryː «Wunderkind», 2014.
