= Jaakko Elo =

Finnish urologist and surgeon

Jaakko Oskari Elo (25 July 1925 – 28 January 2017) was a Finnish urologist, surgeon and medical historian.

== Background ==
Elo was born in Kokemäki, Finland). His parents were construction engineer and entrepreneur Kalle Elo and Eva Elo née Saarivirta, a nurse. Choreographer Jorma Elo is his son. During the Winter War 1939-40 Elo volunteered as orderly at the Civil Defence Staff. After his war service 1942-44 (second lieutenant) Elo studied medicine in Helsinki University, graduated BM-BS and qualified MD 1953 and became Doctor of Medicine 1960. He studied also at Cambridge University 1948 (stipend of British Council) and Necker Hospital in France 1966 (French state stipend) with which he developed a decades long partnership.

== Research and practice ==
Elo researched the virulence and pathogenetic capacities of E.coli bacteria in 1950´s and human blood group antigens present in mushrooms.

He qualified as surgeon 1961. He specialized in pediatric urology as the first MD in Finland, and has developed this branch essentially both in practice and by teaching, as even the general pediatric surgery in Finland in fact began systematically only in 1940s. He taught it as the docent in Helsinki University 1983-92, being the first teacher of pediatric urology in Finland. Elo has published 30 articles in Finnish and international medical publications.

From 1956 to 1988, Elo served as urological surgeon and deputy head of surgical section of Aurora Hospital, Helsinki, and had a private practice in Mehiläinen Hospital, Helsinki, from 1966 to 2002. He founded the journal Urologia Fennica 1986 and was the first Editor. From 1986 to 1988, he was chairman of the Finnish Urological Association. After retirement Elo has focused on the history of urology and museal preservation of medical instruments. From 2000 he was a member of the History Office of the European Association of Urology (EAU).

Elo was an honorary member of the Finnish and Scandinavian Urological Associations. The President of Finland appointed Jaakko Elo Professor HC 2011.

He died on 28 January 2017 at the age of 91.

== Some works ==
- On phytagglutinins present in mushrooms (with E.Estola and N.Malmström), Ann Med Exper Biol Fennica 1951; 29:298-50
- Phytagglutinis present in Marasmius Oreades (with E.Estola), Ann Med Exper Biol Fenn 1952;30:165-7
- Uro-genital infection of the male in relation to ankylosing spondylitis an rheumatoid arthritis (with H.Julkunen and K.Pietilä); Acta Med Scand 1966.
- Néphrobarynose après uréctrocystographie de miction chez les enfants (avec R.Stenström); Journal d´Urologie e de la Nephrologie 1971.
- A cephalexina comparada a ampicillina nas infeccoes das vias urinárias em criancas (with K.Ahava), Revista de Medicina 1977.
- Treatment of childhood urinary tract infection with cinoxacine (with Sarna-Ahava-Leppo; Current Chemotherapy, Washington DC 1978.
- Mannose-resistant hemagglutination and P antigen recognition characteristic of E. soli causing primary pyelonephritis (with Väisänen & al); Lancet 2/1981.
- Character of Urinary Tract Infections and Pyelonephritic Renal Scarring after Antireflux Surgery (with Tallgren, Alfthan and Sarna), in The Journal of Urology 1983 (0022-5347/83/1291-0343 vol 129 February)
- P-Fimbration os Escherichia Coli, Vesicoureteral Reflux an Pyelonephritis in Girls; in “Host-Parasite Interactions in Urinary Tract Infections” (ed. Eden & Kass), University of Chicago Press, 1989.
- Laski laulellen vesiä (history of the Finnish Urological Association 1954-2004, with M.Ala-Opas) Helsinki 2004, 240 p. ISBN 978-95-2917915-2
- Four articles in “Europe – the Cradle of Urology”, EAU, Arnheim 2010, 436 p, ISBN 978-90-9025292-6.
