= Ioanna Avraam =

Ioanna Avraam is a Cypriot ballet dancer, and a first solo dancer at the Vienna State Ballet since 2022. She is one of eight female first solo dancers at the Vienna State Ballet, its most senior dancers.

Avraam was born in Nicosia, Cyprus. She lived with her grandparents until aged three, as her parents were studying overseas. They then moved to Limassol, as her father was a refugee from Famagusta. She trained at the Nadina Loizidou Ballet School in Limassol, and at the Heinz-Bosl-Stiftung/Ballet Academy in Munich.

She started her career with Cyprus' Diastasis Ballet and the Bavarian State Ballet. In 2008, she joined the Vienna State Opera and Volksoper Ballet. In 2010, she was promoted to semi-soloist in 2014 to soloist. In September 2022, she was appointed a first solo dancer by the company's ballet director Martin Schläpfer.

In October 2024, Avraam will be awarded a "Special Recognition" by the jury of the Helena Vaz da Silva European Award for Raising Public Awareness on Europe's Cultural Heritage.
