= Dutch National Ballet =

Ballet company in the Netherlands

The Dutch National Ballet (Dutch: Het Nationale Ballet) is the official and largest ballet company in the Netherlands. Its forerunners were Ballet Der Lage Landen, Ballet of the Nederlandse Opera, Amsterdam Ballet, and Netherlands Ballet (Nederlands Ballet). As of March 2025, the company was directed by Ted Brandsen.

== History ==
The Ballet Der Lage Landen was a pioneering Dutch ballet company founded by artistic director Mascha Ter Weeme in 1947. The Ballet of the Nederlandse Opera was founded in 1949 by French dancer and choreographer Françoise Adret. The two companies merged in 1959 to form the Amsterdam(s) Ballet. Amsterdam Ballet in turn merged with the Netherlands Ballet (Nederlands Ballet) to form the Dutch National Ballet in 1961.

The company's first director was Sonia Gaskell (1961–1969). Gaskell was the founder of Ballet Recital, the forerunner of her more famous Nederlands Ballet (1954-1961). Other directors have included Rudi van Dantzig (1968–1991) and Wayne Eagling (1991–2003).

On 13 September 2011, the company celebrated its 50th anniversary with a gala performance in the presence of Queen Beatrix.

== Description ==
The company has been based at the Dutch National Opera & Ballet (formerly known as Het Muziektheater) in Amsterdam since 1986. As of March 2025 the company is directed by Ted Brandsen.

The company is a regular guest at major festivals across Europe, such as the Edinburgh Festival. It is committed to new choreography and performs work from current and past resident choreographers: Rudi van Dantzig, Toer van Schayk, Hans van Manen, Maguy Marin, and Édouard Lock.

== Dancers ==
The Dutch National Ballet employs approximately 90 dancers. Below is a list of principals, soloists, and grand sujets.

=== Principals ===
Name	Nationality	Training	Joined the Dutch National Ballet	Promoted to Principal	Other Companies (incl. guest performances)
Qian Liu	China	Liaoning Ballet School	2012	2016	Liaoning Ballet
Maia Makhateli	Georgia	Vakhtang Chabukiani State Ballet School	2007	2010	Colorado Ballet; Birmingham Royal Ballet
Anna Ol	Russia	Krasnoyarsk Ballet College	2015	N/A, Joined as Principal	Russian State Ballet of Siberia; Stanislavski and Nemirovich-Danchenko Theatre
Olga Smirnova	Russia	Vaganova Academy of Russian Ballet	2022	N/A, Joined as Principal	Bolshoi Ballet; American Ballet Theatre; Les Ballets de Monte-Carlo; Hamburg Ballet; Mariinsky Ballet; Vienna State Ballet; Teatro dell'Opera di Roma
Anna Tsygankova	Russia	Novobirsk State Choreographic College	2007	N/A, Joined as Principal	Bolshoi Ballet; Hungarian National Ballet
Jessica Xuan	China Canada	Canada's National Ballet School; Dutch National Ballet Academy	2013	2020	National Ballet of Canada
YuanYuan Zhang	China	Sichuan Dance School; Shanghai Theatre Academy	2014	2024	
Constantine Allen	United States	Pacific Ballet Academy; Ballet Hawaii; Kirov Academy of Ballet; John Cranko Schule	2018	N/A, Joined as Principal	Stuttgart Ballet
Young Gyu Choi	South Korea	Korea National Institute for the Gifted in Arts; Tanz Akademie Zurich; Sunhwa Arts School	2011	2016	Universal Ballet
Giorgi Potskhishvili	Georgia	Vakhtang Chabukiani State Ballet School; Dutch National Ballet Academy	2020	2023	
Timothy van Poucke	Netherlands	Dutch National Ballet Academy	2016	2023	
Jacopo Tissi	Italy	La Scala Theatre Ballet School	2023	N/A, Joined as Principal	Vienna State Ballet; La Scala Theatre Ballet; Bolshoi Ballet
Seymon Velichko	Russia	Novobirsk State Choreographic College	2015	2020	Novosibirsk Academic Opera and Ballet Theatre; Stanislavski and Nemirovich-Danchenko Theatre

=== Soloists ===
- Naira Agvanean
- Maria Chugai
- Floor Eimers
- Salome Leverashvili
- Jingjing Mao
- Elisabeth Tonev
- Nina Tonoli
- Joseph Massarelli
- Jan Spunda
- Edo Wijnen
- Sho Yamada

=== Grand sujets ===
- Luiza Bertho
- Kira Hilli
- Erica Horwood
- Chloë Réveillon
- Connie Vowles
- Daniel Montero Real
- Daniel Robert Silva
- Connor Walmsley

== Previous company members ==
- Wim Broeckx
- Sylvester Campbell, 1960-1970.
- Billy Wilson (dancer)
- Benjamin Feliksdal
- Raven Wilkinson
- Marianne Hilarides
- Milena Sidorova, 2005–2022. Grand sujet (2013), coryphée (2011), corps de ballet (2007), élève (2006), aspirant (2005)
