= Prize of the President of the Russian Federation for Young Cultural Figures =

Russian state award

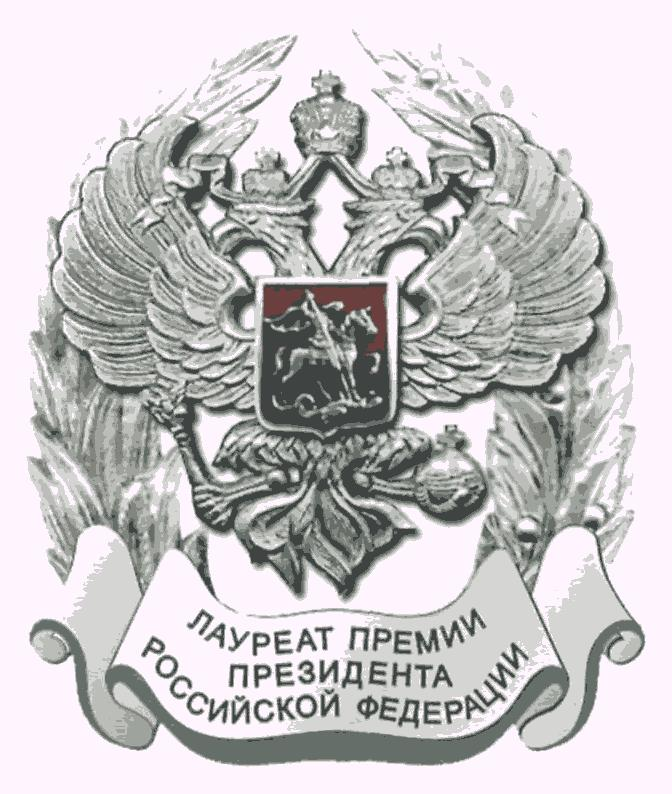
- Badge of the award
- Awarded for: For the creation of talented works of literature and art, the implementation of creative and research projects in the field of culture
- Country: Russia
- Presented by: President of Russia
- Eligibility: Citizens of Russia
- First award: 2011

Highlights
- Total: 47

The Prize of the President of the Russian Federation for Young Cultural Figures (Russian: Премия Президента Российской Федерации для молодых деятелей культуры) is awarded annually to citizens of the Russian Federation up to 35 years of age for the creation of talented works of literature and art, the implementation of creative and research projects in the field of culture (literature, architecture, design, cinematography, fine, decorative and applied, musical and theatrical arts, library science, museum and publishing activities, art education, the preservation of cultural heritage sites, the preservation and development of national cultures of the peoples of the Russian Federation), which are a significant contribution to the culture of the Russian Federation.

== Criteria ==
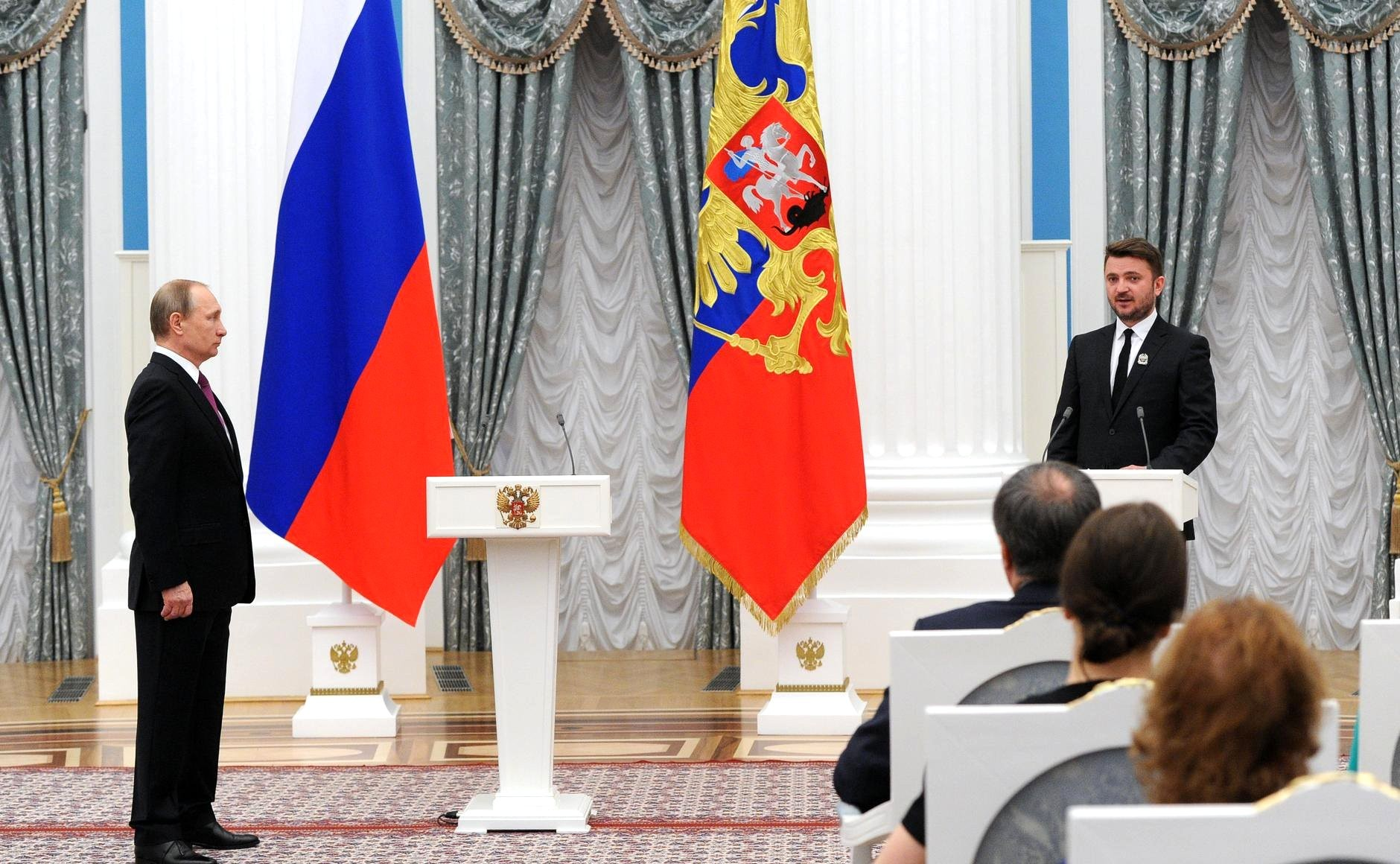
2016 awarding ceremony for 2015 at the Grand Kremlin Palace, 25 March 2016

The prize originally consisted of a cash reward of 5 million rubles (until 2020 it was 2.5 million), a diploma, a laureate's honorary badge and certificate, and a tailcoat badge of the laureate of the Prize of the President of the Russian Federation. The prize may be awarded to one applicant or to a group of applicants consisting of no more than three people. In the event that the prize is awarded to a group of applicants, the cash reward is divided equally between the laureates of this prize, and the diploma, honorary badge and certificate, as well as the tailcoat badge, are awarded to each of the laureates.

The following persons have the right to nominate candidates for the Prize of the President of the Russian Federation:

- Laureates of the Lenin Prize, the USSR State Prize in Literature and Art, the State Prize of the Russian Federation in Literature and Art;
- Full members of the Russian Academy of Sciences, the Russian Academy of Education, the Russian Academy of Architecture and Construction Sciences, the Russian Academy of Arts;
- Holders of the honorary titles "People's Artist of the USSR", "People's Artist of the Russian Federation", "People's Artist of the USSR", "People's Artist of the Russian Federation", "People's Architect of the Russian Federation"; artistic, scientific and scientific (scientific and methodological) councils of cultural organizations, scientific and educational organizations

== Lauretes ==
=== 2011 (for 2010) ===
The following were awarded the prize in 2011:

- Darima Bazarova - "for her contribution to the preservation of the historical and cultural heritage of the republic using modern information technologies"
- Maria Markova - "for her contribution to the development of the traditions of Russian poetry"
- Ekaterina Mechetina - "for her contribution to the development of the traditions of Russian musical art and her high level of performing skills".

=== 2012 (for 2011) ===
The following were awarded the prizes in 2012:

- Venera Gimadieva — "for outstanding performance skills, enriching and developing the traditions of the national vocal school
- Mansur Musayev — "for contribution to the development and promotion of national art, implementation of peacekeeping projects"
- Arseniy Chakrygin — "for contribution to the development of national architecture, formation of a professional communication environment using modern information technologies."

=== 2013 (for 2012) ===
The following were awarded the prizes in 2013:

- Olga Malyshko — "for contribution to the development of local history, ensuring the integration of information resources of the Altai Krai into the global information space"
- Yulia Peresild — "for contribution to the development of national theater and cinema"
- Evgeny Sosedov — "for contribution to the preservation of the historical appearance of the Moscow Oblast"

=== 2014 (for 2013) ===
The following were awarded the prizes in 2014 awarded:

- Anna Aglatova — “for her contribution to the development of Russian musical art”
- Anton Ivanov — “for his contribution to the preservation and restoration of historical and cultural monuments”
- Pavel Matviets — “for his contribution to the development of Russian museum affairs”

=== 2015 (for 2014) ===
The following were awarded the prize in 2015:

- Sergey Volobuyev, Oleg Gabyshev and Dmitry Fisher, soloists of the Boris Eifman Ballet Theatre — “for the development of Russian choreographic art traditions”.
- Alexander Gorbunov, Vasily Kulygin, Alexey Lyalin, artists of the Omsk Northern Drama Theatre — “for their participation in the creation of the Omsk State Northern Drama Theatre named after M.A. Ulyanov”.
- Sofia Geveiler, Dmitry Petrov — “for the embodiment of humanistic ideals in the documentary film about the Paralympic Games ‘Spirit in Motion’”.

=== 2016 (for 2015) ===
The following were awarded the prizes in 2016:

- Vladislav Lavrik - "for the development of traditions and popularization of brass art"
- Evgeniya Lotsmanova - "for the development of domestic illustration art"
- Elena Cheburashkina - "for the development of domestic design and art education"

=== 2017 (for 2016) ===
The following were awarded the prizes in 2017:

- Vera Lagutenkova - "for her contribution to the development of domestic art education and educational activities"
- Anton Shagin - "for performing roles in classical and modern repertoire in theater and cinema"
- Viktor Shalay - "for his contribution to the preservation and popularization of historical and cultural heritage, and the creation of modern museum exhibitions".

=== 2018 (for 2017) ===
The following were awarded the Prize in 2018:

- Dina Velikovskaya - "for her contribution to the development of Russian animation art",
- Sofya Kondratieva - "for the creation and implementation of innovative museum projects",
- Denis Rodkin - "for his contribution to the preservation, enhancement and popularization of the achievements of Russian choreographic art".

=== 2019 (for 2018) ===
The following were awarded the Prize in 2019:

- Nikolay Pereslegin - "for his contribution to the development of Russian architecture and the preservation of cultural heritage",
- Valentin Uryupin - "for his contribution to the development of Russian musical art",
- Sergey Chekhov - "for his contribution to the development of the traditions of the Russian theater school".

=== 2020 (for 2019) ===
The following were awarded the prizes in 2020:

- Oleg Akkuratov — “for his contribution to the development of Russian musical art and educational activities”,
- Olga Smirnova — “for his contribution to the development of Russian choreographic art”,
- Maksim Shaposhnikov — “for the implementation of the cultural and educational project “All-Russian School of Club Innovations”.

=== 2021 (for 2020) ===
The following were awarded the prizes in 2021:

- Dimitris Botinis — “for his contribution to the development of the traditions of Russian musical art and educational activities”,
- Elmir Nizamov — “for his contribution to the continuation of the traditions of the Russian school of composition”,
- Anna Chipovskaya — “for performing roles of the classical and modern repertoire in theater and cinema”.

=== 2022 (for 2021) ===
The following were awarded the Prize in 2022:

- Oksana Kardash — "for outstanding performance skills, development of the traditions of Russian choreographic art",
- Sofia Kiprskaya — "for contribution to the development and popularization of the traditions of the Russian harp school",
- Dmitry Serdyuk — "for contribution to the development of Russian theatrical art, preservation and popularization of the historical and cultural heritage of Russia".

=== 2023 (for 2022) ===
The following were awarded the Prize in 2023:

- Aydar Zabbarov — "for contribution to the development of Russian theatrical art";
- Ekaterina Pilnikova — "for a series of sculptural works dedicated to outstanding representatives of Russian culture and art";
- Sergei Polunin — "for contribution to the development and popularization of Russian choreographic art".

=== 2024 (for 2023) ===
The following were awarded the prize in 2024:

- Alexey Kryukov - "for his contribution to the preservation and development of the traditions of the Russian realistic art school"
- Mengi Ondar - "for his contribution to the preservation, development and popularization of the cultural heritage of the Tuvan people"
- Aleksandr Ramm - "for his contribution to the development of Russian musical art and educational activities".
