= Anna Tsygankova =

Russian ballet dancer

Anna Tsygankova Анна Цыганкова
- Born: November 6, 1979 (age 46); Novosibirsk, Siberia, Soviet Union
- Partner: Matthew Golding (2011–2017)
- Children: 1
- Career
- Current group: Dutch National Ballet
- Former groups: Hungarian National Ballet

Anna Tsygankova (Russian: Анна Цыганкова; born 1979) is a Russian ballet dancer. After terms with the Bolshoi and the Hungarian National Ballet, she joined the Dutch National Ballet in 2008 where she is a principal dancer.

== Early life ==
Born in Novosibirsk, Siberia, she received her training at the Novosibirsk Ballet Academy and the Académie de Danse Classique Princesse Grace in Monte Carlo.

== Career ==
While she was with the Bolshoi Ballet in Moscow, she was coached by Raisa Struchkova. In 2004, she joined the Hungarian National Ballet in Budapest before moving to Amsterdam in 2007 to join the Dutch National Ballet as a principal dancer.

Tsygankova's repertoire include Giselle, Nikya in La Bayadère, Odette/Odile in Swan Lake, Aurora in The Sleeping Beauty and repertory by George Balanchine, Rudi van Dantzig, Wayne Eagling, William Forsythe, Kenneth MacMillan and Hans van Manen. Her role creations include Kitri in Alexei Ratmansky's Don Quixote and Christopher Wheeldon’s Cinderella.

She had made guest appearances with the Hong Kong Ballet and The Royal Ballet in 2014 and 2015 respectively, dancing Kitri in Don Quixote with both companies.

Reviewing her performance of Cinderella, The Guardian noted that emotionally, "she carries the piece."

In 2017, Tsygankova took time off from dancing to prepare for her child's birth. She returned to the Dutch National Ballet in October 2018 with La Dame aux Camélias.

Tsygankova's performances in Cinderella, Giselle, Mata Hari, The Nutcracker, and Don Quixote have been filmed in recent years.

== Awards ==
- 1995, Prix de Lausanne (Switzerland), silver
- 1996, International Balletconcours, bronze
- 2008, Alexandria Radius Award
- 2012, Nomination Benois de la Danse
- 2014 Grand Prix, Dance Open Festival, St Petersburg
- 2016 Mrs. Expressivity award, Dance Open Festival, St. Petersburg
- 2017 Dancer of the Year – Critic's Choice
- 2017 Merit Award – Dansersfonds '79
