= Maria Markova =

Russian poet (born 1982)

- Мария Маркова
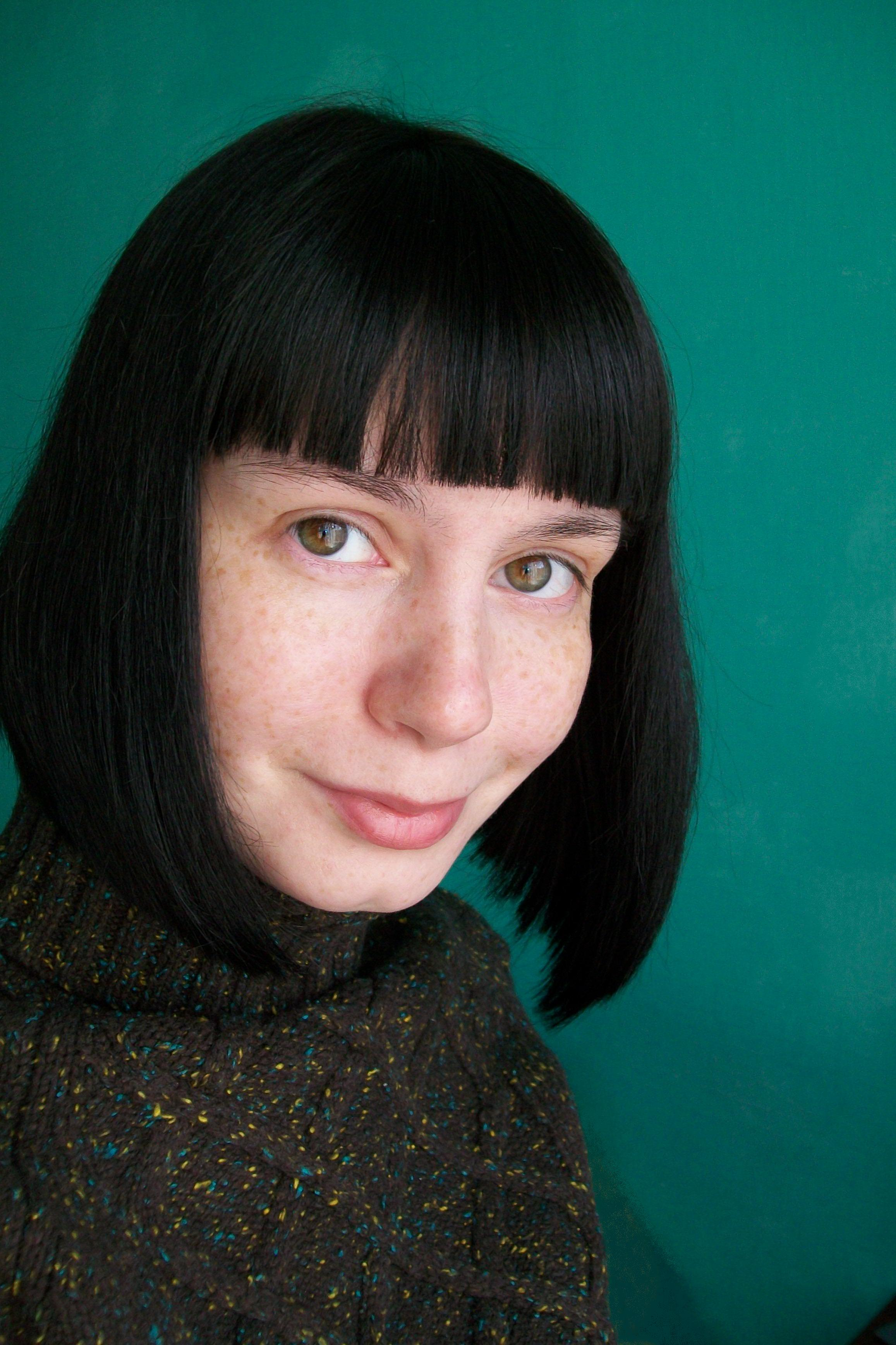
- Markova in 2008
- Born: 5 February 1982 (age 44); Mys Shmidta, Soviet Union
- Education: Vologda State Pedagogical University
- Occupation: Poet
- Awards: Prize of the President of the Russian Federation for Young Cultural Figures
- Website: mmavochka.livejournal.com

Maria Markova (Russian: Мария Александровна Маркова; born 5 February 1982) is a Russian poet.

== Biography ==
She was born in 1982, in Mys Shmidta in Siberia, Soviet Union. In her early childhood, she moved to the Vologda Oblast. Markova started writing poetry very early. In 2005-2007 she published two small brochures (without any success), but a little later few journal publications have brought her fame. In 2008 she joined the Union of Russian Writers. Most authoritative Russian literary magazines published her works (Znamya, Literaturnaya Gazeta, Druzhba narodov etc.).

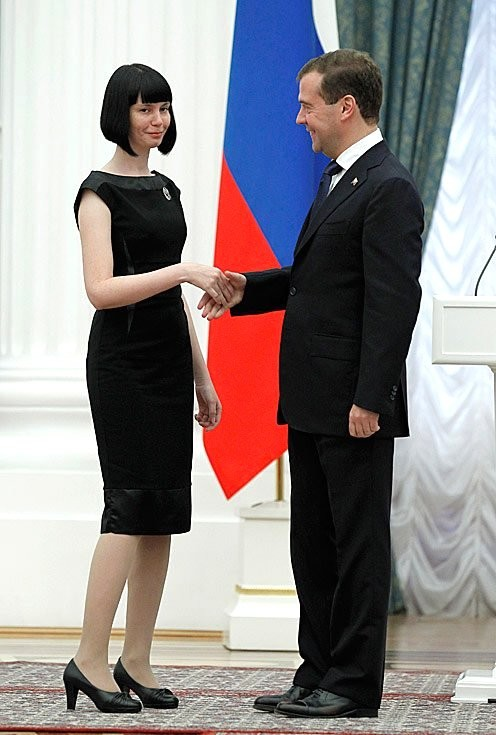
Markova in 2011 receiving the Prize of the President of the Russian Federation for Young Cultural Figures from president Dmitry Medvedev at the Grand Kremlin Palace

From 2008 to 2010, Maria Markova received few prestigious literary awards, including the personal Grant of the Russian Ministry of Culture. In 2011, Markova received the Presidential Award for young art workers "for her contribution to the traditions of Russian poetry". In the same year she was recognized as a "Writer of the Year" by the magazine "Rendez-vous".

In 2012, Markova published her first book Solominka (The Straw).
