= Four Last Songs (ballet) =

1970s ballet to Richard Strauss' music of the same name

Four Last Songs is a ballet made by Lorca Massine to Richard Strauss' eponymous music from 1946-48. First presented in 1970 at the workshop of its affiliated School of American Ballet, the New York City Ballet premiere took place on 21 January 1971 at the New York State Theater, Lincoln Center.

== Original cast ==
- Susan Pilarre
- Bonnie Moore
- Meg Gordon
- Johnna Kirkland
- Lisa de Ribere
- Bonita Borne
- Robert Maiorano
- Bryan Pitts
- Nolan T’Sani
