= Vienna State Ballet =

Ballet company in Austria

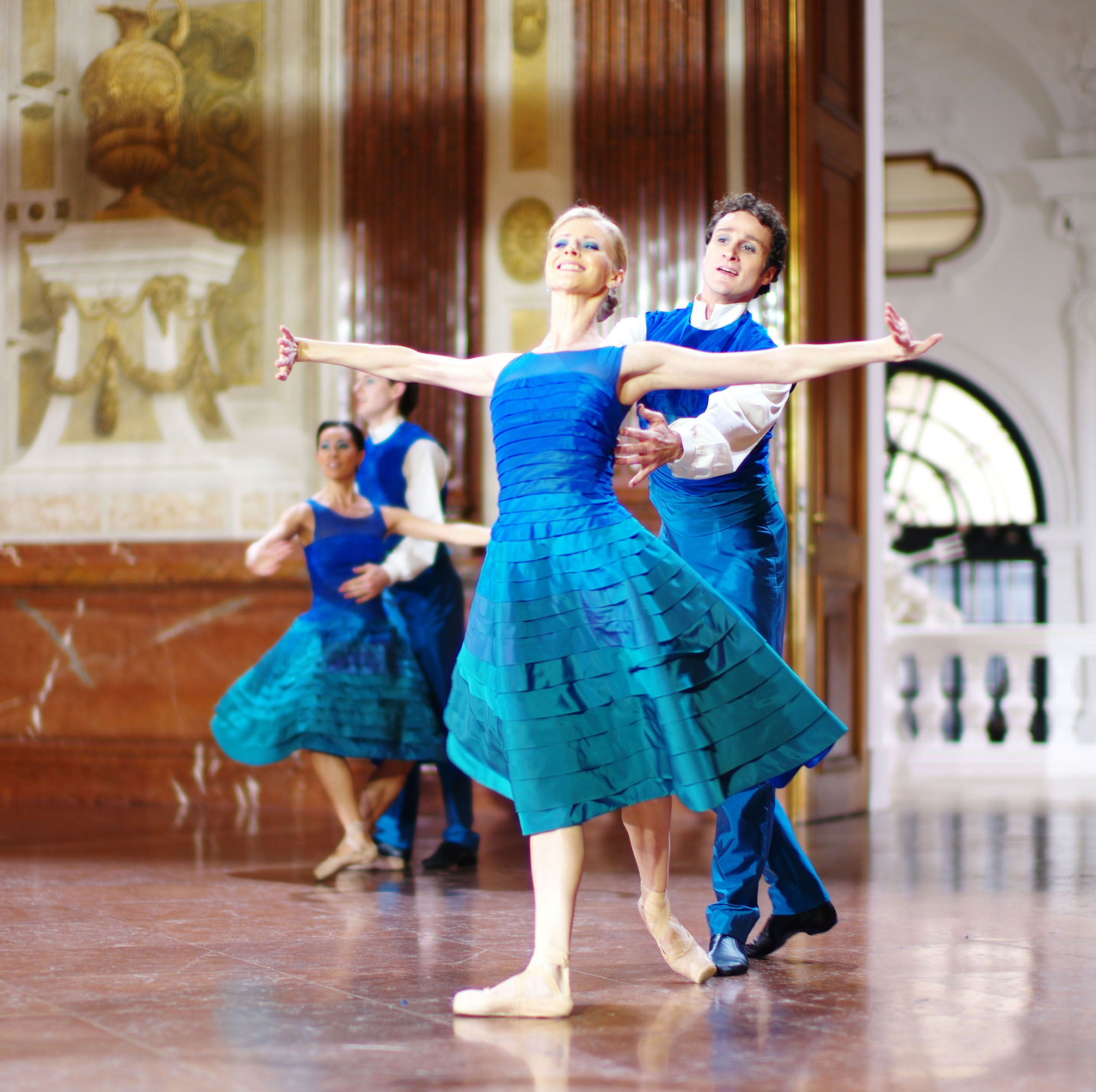
Vienna State Ballet dancers Olga Esina and Roman Lazik perform "Donauwalzer" in the Belvedere Palace, Vienna, Austria, on 31 December 2011

Vienna State Ballet, Wiener Staatsballett, is considered one of the world's top ballet companies. It was formerly named the Vienna State Opera Ballet as it is based at the Vienna State Opera building. In 2005 the ballets of the Vienna State Opera and the Vienna Volksoper were merged under the name Das Ballett der Wiener Staatsoper und Volksoper and Gyula Harangozo became the artistic director. On 1 September 2010, a further name change was accompanied by a change in leadership. Manuel Legris, former principal dancer with the Paris Opera Ballet, succeeded as the artistic director.

== First solo dancers (as of September 2024) ==
=== Female ===
- Ioanna Avraam
- Elena Bottaro
- Olga Esina
- Kiyoka Hashimoto
- Hyo-Jung Kang
- Liudmila Konovalova
- Ketevan Papava
- Claudine Schoch

=== Male ===
- Victor Caixeta
- Davide Dato
- Masayu Kimoto
- Marcos Menha
- Alexey Popov
- Brendan Saye

== 2010–2011 season ==
In his first season Legris created all together eight premieres, including the triple bill evening "Juwelen der Neuen Welt" (Jewels of the New World) featuring ballets by George Balanchine (Theme and Variations, Rubies), Twyla Tharp (Variations on a Theme by Haydn) and William Forsythe (The Vertiginous Thrill of Exactitude), Schritte und Spuren (Steps and Traces) with choreographies by Jorma Elo (Glow – Stop), Jiří Bubeníček (Le Souffle de l´Esprit), Paul Lightfoot and Sol León (Skew-Whiff) and Jiří Kylián (Bella Figura), Don Quixote by Rudolf Nureyev after Marius Petipa, and Hommage an Jerome Robbins (Homage to Jerome Robbins) including his ballets Glass Pieces, In the Night and The Concert and the Nureyev Gala 2011 at the Vienna State Opera. At the Vienna Volksoper he brought Patrick de Bana's Marie Antoinette, Maurice Béjart's Le Concours and the ballet evening "Junge Talente des Wiener Staatsballetts" (Young Talents of the Vienna State Ballet).

== 2011–2012 season ==
In the second season three premieres followed in the Vienna State Opera: Pierre Lacotte's La Sylphide, the triple bill evening "Meisterwerke des 20. Jahrhunderts" (Masterpieces of the 20th Century) with Serge Lifar's Suite en Blanc, Nils Christe's Before Nightfall, and Roland Petit's L’Arlésienne, and the Nureyev Gala 2012. At the Vienna Volksoper he presented a triple bill evening with Vesna Orlic's Carmina Burana, Boris Nebyla's Nachmittag eines Fauns (Afternoon of a Faun) and András Lukács' Bolero.

== 2012–2013 season ==
During the third season three premieres were staged at the Vienna State Opera: Rudolf Nureyev's Der Nussknacker (The Nutcracker), the quadruple bill evening "Tanzperspektiven" (Dance Perspectives) with David Dawson's A Million Kisses to My Skin, Helen Pickett's Eventide, Patrick de Bana's Windspiele (Wind Chimes) and Jean-Christophe Maillot's Vers un pays sage, and the Nuryev Gala 2013. At the Vienna Volksoper there were also three premieres with Stephan Thoss‘ Blaubarts Geheimnis (Bluebeard‘s Secret), Jorma Elo's Ein Sommernachtstraum (A Midsummernight's Dream), and the ballet evening "Kreation und Tradition" (Creation and Tradition).

== 2013–2014 season ==
The fourth season brought the three premieres: "Ballett-Hommage" (Ballet Homage) with William Forsythe's The Second Detail, Natalia Horecna's Contra Clockwise Witness and Harald Lander's Études, Swan Lake by Rudolf Nureyev after Marius Petipa and Lev Ivanov, and the Nureyev Gala 2014. At the Vienna Volksoper there were two premieres: the double bill evening "Märchenwelt Ballett" with Vesna Orlic's Tausendundeine Nacht (One Thousand and One Nights), and Andrey Kaydanovskiy's Das hässliche Entlein (The Ugly Duckling), and Ein Reigen by Ashley Page.

== 2014–2015 season ==
In the fifth season three premieres followed at the Vienna State Opera: John Neumeier's Verklungene Feste and Josephs Legende, a triple bill evening with Hans van Manen's Adagio Hammerklavier, Alexander Ekman's Cacti, and Jiří Kylián's Bella Figura and the Nureyev Gala 2015. Three premieres followed also at the Vienna Volksoper: the double bill evening Mozart à 2 / Don Juan by Thierry Malandain, Giselle Rouge (Red Giselle) by Boris Eifman, and "Junge Talente des Wiener Staatsballetts II" (Young Talents of the Vienna State Ballet II).

== 2015–2016 season ==
The sixth season brought another three premieres at the Vienna State Opera: a triple bill evening with Stephan Thoss' Blaubarts Geheimnis (excerpt) ("Bluebeard's Secret"), Christopher Wheeldon's Fool’s Paradise, and Jerome Robbins' The Four Seasons, as well as Manuel Legris' own choreography of Le Corsaire and the Nureyev Gala 2016. At the Vienna Volksoper Michael Corder's Die Schneekönigin ("The Snow Queen") had its premiere.

== 2016–2017 season ==
In his seventh season Manuel Legris showed three premieres at the Vienna State Opera: a triple bill evening with George Balanchine's Symphonie in C, Edwaard Liang's Murmuration, and Daniel Proietto's Blanc; a double bill evening with John Neumeier's Le Pavillon d'Armide and Le Sacre, and the Nureyev Gala 2017. At the Vienna Volksoper two premieres followed: Thierry Malandain's Cendrillon (Cinderella), and a triple bill evening with Andrey Kaydanovskiy's Der Feuervogel (The Firebird), Eno Peci's Petruschka and András Lukács' Movements to Stravinsky.

== 2017–2018 season ==
In his eighth season Legris presented three premieres at the Vienna State Opera: a triple bill evening with Kenneth MacMillan's Concerto, Wayne McGregor's EDEN | EDEN, and Frederick Ashton's Marguerite and Armand; Edward Clug's Peer Gynt, and the Nureyev Gala 2018. At the Vienna Volksoper one premiere followed: Davide Bombana's Roméo et Juliette.

== 2018–2019 season ==
In his ninth season he showed three premieres at the Vienna State Opera: his own choreography Sylvia, a quadruple bill evening with William Forsythe's Artifact Suite, Hans van Manen's Trois Gnossiennes and Solo, and Jiří Kylián's Psalmensymphonie, and the Nureyev Gala 2019. At the Vienna Volksoper two premieres followed: Pierre Lacotte's Coppélia, and Vesna Orlic's Peter Pan.

== 2019–2020 season ==
In his tenth and last season at the Wiener Staatsballett Manuel Legris presents three premieres at the Vienna State Opera: George Balanchine's Jewels, the triple bill evening with András Lucács' Movements to Stravinsky, Pontus Lidberg's world premiere Between Dogs and Wolves, and Nacho Duato's White Darkness, and the Nureyev Gala 2020. At the Vienna Volksoper two more premieres are going to follow: Mauro Bigonzetti's La Piaf, and the triple bill Appassionato - Bach und Vivaldi with Boris Nebyla's Il Prete Rosso, Eno Peci's Monkey Mind, and Martin Winter's Not Another Now.

== See also ==
- List of productions of Swan Lake derived from its 1895 revival
