= Sergei Polunin =

Ukrainian ballet dancer, actor and model (born 1989)

- Сергей Полунин
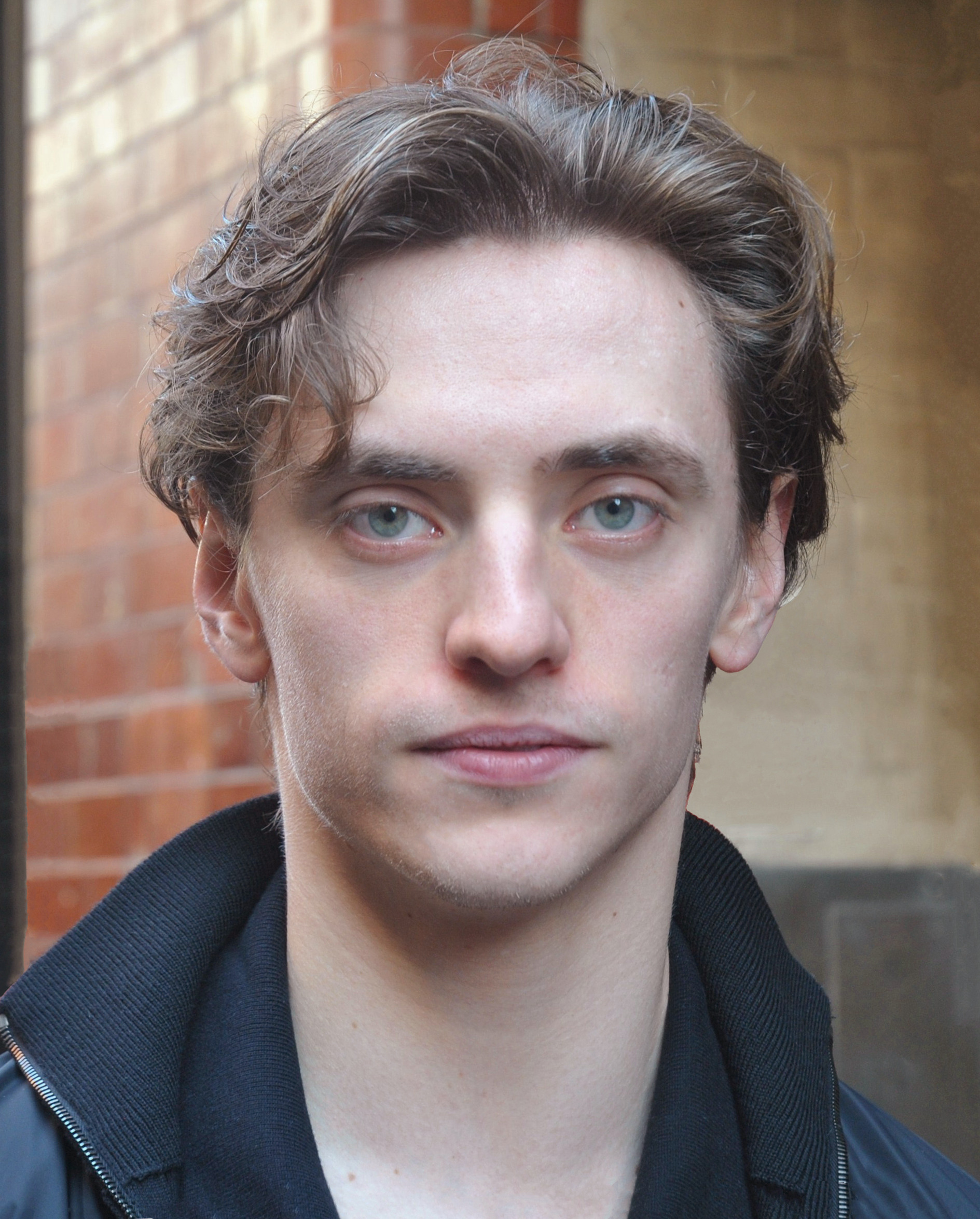
- Polunin in 2013
- Born: Sergei Vladimirovich Polunin; 20 November 1989 (age 36); Kherson, Ukrainian SSR, Soviet Union
- Citizenship: Ukraine (revoked); Russia; Serbia
- Education: Kyiv State Choreographic College
- Occupations: Ballet dancer; actor; model
- Years active: 2006–present
- Spouse: Elena Ilinykh (m. 2024)
- Children: 3
- Awards: Prize of the President of the Russian Federation for Young Cultural Figures
- Website: https://poluninink.com/

Sergei Vladimirovich Polunin (Russian: Сергей Владимирович Полунин; Ukrainian: Сергій Володимирович Полунін, romanized: Serhiy Volodymyrovych Polunin; born 20 November 1989) is a Russian ballet dancer, actor and model. He has Russian and Serbian citizenships, and has "always regarded himself as Russian". In 2025, he was stripped of his Ukrainian citizenship.

Born in Kherson, Ukrainian SSR, Polunin started out in gymnastics before switching to ballet at the age of eight and attended the Kyiv State Choreographic College. After graduating, he joined the British Royal Ballet School at the age of 13 in 2003. Polunin has received numerous awards, including the Prix de Lausanne and Youth America Grand Prix in 2006, and in 2007 was named the Young British Dancer of the Year. In 2010, at the age of 20, Polunin became the Royal Ballet's youngest ever male principal dancer.

After two years, he quit the ballet company to focus on a freelance career. As a freelance principal dancer, Polunin has been a guest artist at various theatres worldwide, such as Royal Opera House, Sadler's Wells Theatre, Bolshoi Theatre, Stanislavski and Nemirovich-Danchenko Moscow Academic Music Theatre, La Scala Theatre, Teatro San Carlo and was a guest artist for the Bayerisches Staatsballet.

== Early life ==
Sergei Polunin was born in Kherson, Ukrainian SSR. From the age of four to eight, he trained at a gymnastics academy, and then spent another four years at the Kyiv State Choreographic Institute. His mother, Galina, moved with him to Kyiv, while his father, Vladimir Polunin, worked in Portugal to support them.

== Dancing career ==
=== 2003–2013: Early years ===
After Polunin graduated from the Kyiv Choreographic Academy (КДХУ), he joined the British Royal Ballet School at the age of 13 in 2003, sponsored by the Rudolf Nureyev Foundation. Polunin has received numerous awards, including the Prix de Lausanne and Youth America Grand Prix in 2006, and in 2007 was named the Young British Dancer of the Year. He became a first soloist at the Royal Ballet in 2009. In June 2010, at the age of 20, Polunin became the Royal Ballet's youngest ever male principal. The New York Times described Polunin as "a fabulous dancer, with a steely technique and beautiful line" in its review of Alice’s Adventures in Wonderland (2011) when he danced as the Knave, who doubled as Alice's romantic interest.

After two successful years with the Royal Ballet, on 24 January 2012, Polunin announced his resignation from the company with immediate effect. He said he had become so unhappy that, "the artist in [him] was dying." Several months later, in summer 2012, Polunin was invited to Russia by the artistic director of ballet of the two Russian theatres, Igor Zelensky, and became a principal dancer with the Stanislavsky Music Theatre and Novosibirsk State Academic Opera and Ballet Theatre. In early April 2013, it was reported that Polunin had walked out on the Schaufuss Ballet's performance of Midnight Express just days before its opening night.

=== 2014–present: International recognition ===
He was first shown in the international spotlight in the role of Slavemaster/Shepherd in the 25th Anniversary The Phantom of the Opera at the Royal Albert Hall. Polunin was shortlisted as the best male dancer for the 2014 National Dance awards in the U.K. In 2014, Polunin started his collaboration with American photographer and music director David LaChapelle and took part in his new projects, including a dance video to the song "Take Me to Church" by Hozier in February 2015. The video went viral and exposed Polunin to a wider audience. Polunin was the subject of the 2016 documentary film Dancer, directed by Steven Cantor, analyzing his childhood, training, and rise to international fame.

In 2017, he set up Project Polunin, which aims to create new dance and ballet works for both stage and film. Project Polunin aims to bring together dancers, contemporary artists, musicians and choreographers from various creative backgrounds to work together. In June 2018, a promotional video starring Polunin was featured in a grand ceremony of the reopening of the National Museum of Serbia after 15 years of renovation and in July of the same year, Polunin performed on the Main Stage of the Serbian EXIT festival for the grand opening ceremony of 18th festival edition. His performance was inspired by the festival's theme, dubbed EXIT Freedom. The company was reincorporated as Polunin Ink in 2018. That year, Polunin also starred in the video for Hozier's song "Movement", which namedropped him in the lyrics.

In January 2019, Polunin was invited to perform in the Paris Opéra Ballet's Swan Lake. The Ballet revoked the invitation 48 hours later after being notified of Polunin's recent homophobic and sexist Instagram posts that sparked international outrage, including from dancers within the company.

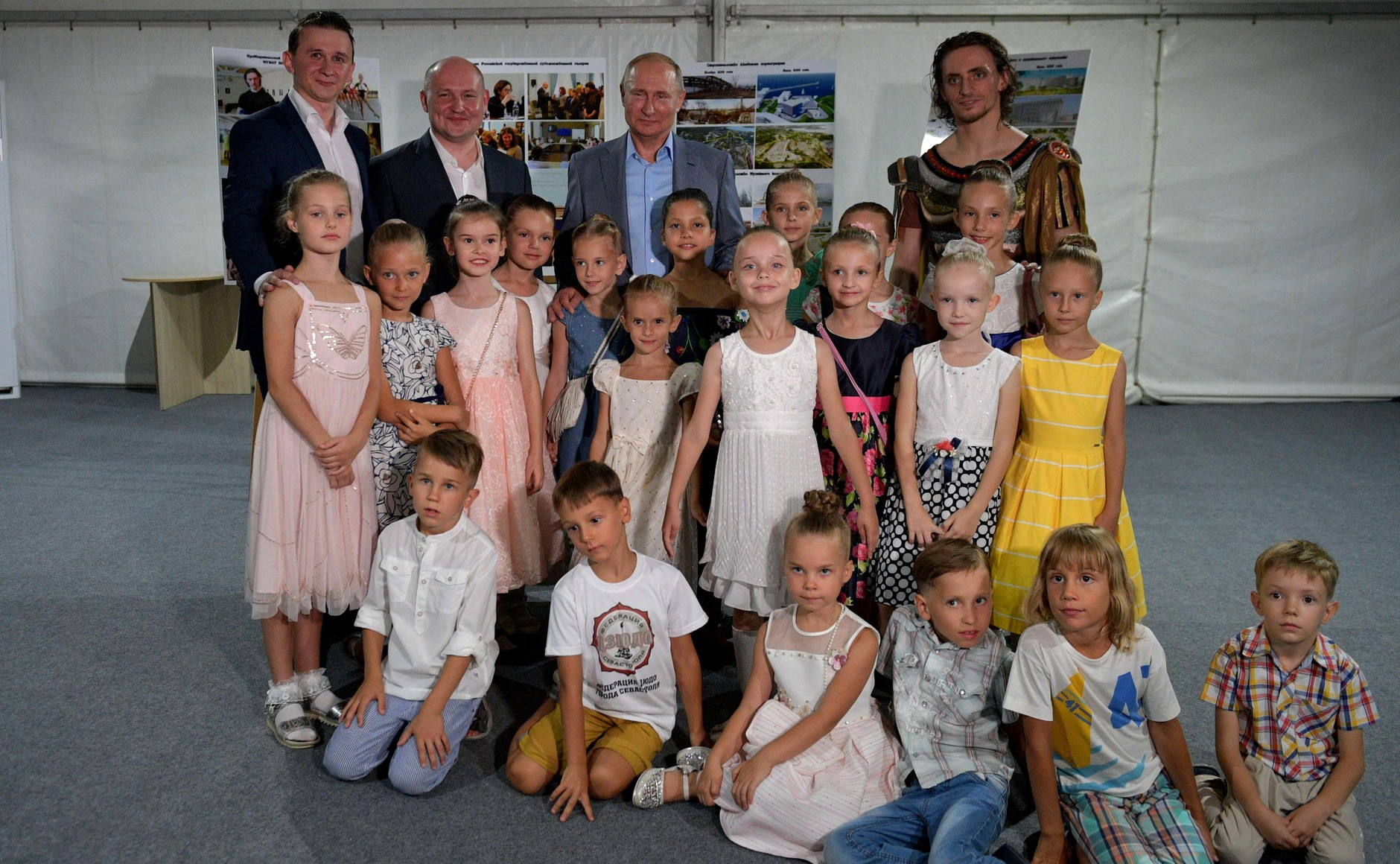
Polunin with Russian president Vladimir Putin and future students of the Sevastopol Academy of Choreography, 13 August 2019

Polunin and his company, Polunin Ink introduced three new productions of ballet in 2019. The first was Rasputin, choreographed by Yuka Oishi and premiered in London Palladium in June; the show received generally negative reviews from London critics but was later successfully shown in cities such as Zurich and Tashkent. The second was on 26 August 2019, Polunin danced the role of Romeo in Romeo and Juliet choreographed by Johan Kobborg and with Alina Cojocaru as Juliet, in the Verona Arena to over 10,000 members in the audience and to critical acclaim. As the year closed, the third production of Polunin Ink, Little Red and the Wolf, choreographed by Ross Freddie Ray, music composed by Kirill Richter, and performed by Sergei Polunin, Laura Fernandez-Gromova, Johan Kobborg and premiered in Zaryadye Concert Hall, Moscow on 29 and 30 December 2019. In 2019, he also performed in Dubai, Israel, Munich, and Shanghai. Noteworthy was the performance on 7 September 2019 when he was invited to dance at the ancient Buddhist temple Ninna-ji in Kyoto, Japan. Branded as the "Encounter of the East and the West", efforts were put into illustrating the theme with artists from Europe and Asia performing on the stage. Polunin's outfit was a carefully crafted kimono specially designed and made by artist Kamida Kazumak and with the calligraphy of the Heart Sutra, which teaches the illusion of the phenomenal world, written on the outfit by calligrapher, Tomoko Kawao. The performance was later broadcast nationwide in Japan.

Polunin was recognized as the Personality of the Year by Danza & Danza Awards 2019 (Premio D&D-Mario Bedendo), for which the jury wrote: "A multi-faceted artist...he and his Polunin Ink company scored not one but two goals in 2019", namely, "a 'modern' take on the twentieth-century classic Romeo & Juliet where Polunin gave a powerful, passionate performance opposite Alina Cojocaru", and “Rasputin a memorable dance-drama in which Sergei outdid himself". In 2023 he was awarded the Prize of the President of the Russian Federation for Young Cultural Figures.

Polunin fully supported the 2022 Russian invasion of Ukraine and was invited to speak and perform at government-organized ceremonies. He was censured after performing/dancing to a song dedicated to fallen Russian soldiers while on tour in Uzbekistan. He performed in full military uniform which Uzbek authorities said deviated from the planned programme.

== Performances and projects ==
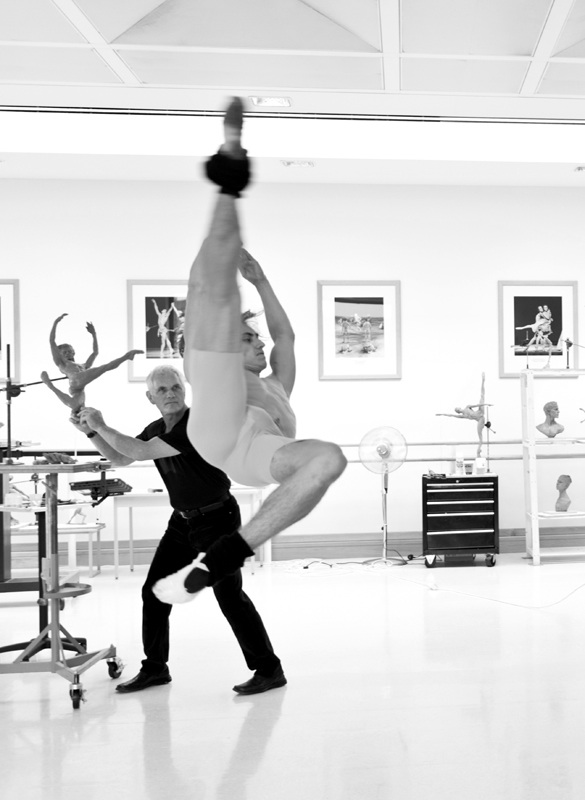
Polunin in Richard MacDonald's studio

- The Woodsman. Red Riding Hood, with Johan Kobborg, Laura Fernandez-Gromova and choreography by Ross Freddie-Ray, music by Kirill Richter, scenery designer Otto Bubeníček at the Zaryadye Concert Hall in Moscow on 29 and 30 December 2019.
- Romeo. Romeo and Juliet with music by Sergei Prokofyev, with Alina Cojocaru in the role of Juliet, choreography by Johan Kobborg, set designer: David Umemoto, lighting designer: Konstantin Binkin. World premiere in Arena di Verona, 26 August 2019
- Rasputin. Rasputin with music by Kirill Richter, with Alexey Lyubimov, Johan Kobborg, Djordje Kalenic, Elena Ilinykh, choreography by Yuka Oishi, set designer: Otto Bubeníček, lighting designer: Konstantin Binkin, costume designer: Ulyana Sergeenko. World premiere in London Palladium, 31 May 2019
- Sacré, based on Stravinsky's 'Sacre du Printemps', choreography by Yuka Oishi, World premiere Origen Festival Cultural, Julier Pass 14 July 2018
- Sartori, with music by Lorenz Dangel, with Natalia Osipova, Jason Reilly, Alexey Lyubimov, Thomas Waddington, choreography by Sergei Polunin, set design: David LaChapelle, costume design: Angelina Atlagic, lighting design: Christian Kass, director: Gabriel Marcel del Vecchio, World premiere London Coliseum 10 December 2017
- Spartacus. Spartacus by Y. Grigorovich and Aram Khachaturian (premiere – 2014, Novosibirsk)
- Rudolf. Mayerling by Sir Kenneth MacMillan (premiere – 2013, Moscow)
- Des Grieux. L'histoire de Manon with choreography by Sir Kenneth MacMillan
- Aminta. Sylvia with choreography by Frederick Ashton
- Solor. La Bayadère with music by Ludwig Minkus and choreography by Natalia Makarova
- Albrect. Giselle with music by Adolphe Adam
- Nutcracker Prince.The Nutcracker with music by Pyotr Ilyich Tchaikovsky
- Prince. Cinderella with music by Sergei Prokofyev
- Prince Désiré. The Sleeping Beauty with music by Pyotr Ilyich Tchaikovsky
- Armand. Marguerite and Armand with choreography by Frederick Ashton
- Main part in Rhapsody with choreography by Frederick Ashton
- Knave of Hearts. Alice's Adventures in Wonderland with choreography by Christopher Wheeldon — the first performer of the role and a participant of the first premiere
- Basilio. Don Quixote with music by Ludwig Minkus and choreography by Alexander Gorsky edited by M. Chichinadze
- Ali. Le Corsaire with music by Adolphe Adam and choreography by Marius Petipa and Pyotr Gusev edited by Khomyakov and Zelensky
- Frantz. Coppélia with choreography by Roland Petit
- Prince Siegfried, Swan Lake with music by Pyotr Ilyich Tchaikovsky
- Wolf, Peter and Wolf with music by Sergei Prokofyev
- Slave Master (Hannibal) and Shepherd (Il Muto) in Andrew Lloyd Webber’s Phantom of the Opera at the Royal Albert Hall in Celebration of 25 Years
- Faun and James Dean for the project Men in Motion by Ivan Putrov
- Dior Project
- Performances for the Russian project Big Ballet (Bolshoi Balet) on TV-channel Kultura (Culture): Narcissus by Kasyan Goleizovsky, Bourgeois by Ben Van Cauwenbergh, 100 Celsius by Emil Faski, Armand from Marguerite and Armand by Frederick Ashton, Frantz from Coppélia by Roland Petit and Akteon from Diana and Akteon by Agrippina Vaganova
- Faun for the Bohemian Tune concert in Moscow with Gérard Depardieu, choreographed by Sergei Polunin and Alexey Lyubimov
- Lucien d'Hervilly, Paquita grand pas – premiere took place in Novosibirsk State Opera and Ballet Theatre, 9 November 2013. Choreographed by Igor Zelensky and Yana Serebriakova.

== Awards ==
- Prize Winner, Serge Lifar International Ballet Competition (2002)
- Gold medal and Audience Award, the Prix de Lausanne (2006)
- Winner, Youth America Grand Prix /YAGP/ (2006)
- Gold medal, Serge Lifar International Ballet Competition in Kyiv (2006)
- The Young British Dancer of the year in the United Kingdom (2007)
- Critics' Circle National Dance Awards for the Best Male Dancer (2010)
- Critics' Circle National Dance Awards for the Best Classical Male Dancer (2011)
- Winner, Russian TV-project and competition Big Ballet, Bolshoi Ballet (2012)
- Soul of Dance award (Russian Ballet magazine, 2014)
- Personality of the Year, Danza& Danza Awards (2019) (Italian magazine)

== Acting career ==
Polunin made his feature film debut in the 2017 adaptation of Murder on the Orient Express, followed by a performance in the 2018 film Red Sparrow. In 2018, he appeared as Yuri Soloviev in the Rudolf Nureyev biopic The White Crow, directed by Ralph Fiennes. In 2021, in played one of the two lead roles in Simple Passion, directed by Danielle Arbid.

== Personal life ==
As of 2020, Polunin is engaged to Russian ice dancer Elena Ilinykh. On 16 January 2020, their son, Mir, was born in Miami, Florida, U.S. In April 2022, their second son, Dar, was born. In March 2026, their daughter, Runa, was born.

Along with a number of other celebrities, Polunin was granted Serbian citizenship in 2017, for his work in promoting the country and its culture.

In November 2018, Polunin posted on his Instagram account voicing support for Russian president Vladimir Putin. In December 2018, Polunin expressed admiration and support for U.S. president Donald Trump in another Instagram post.

In 2022, Polunin revealed photos displaying multiple tattoos of Putin's head across his upper torso, which led to controversy. Arcimboldi, a theatre in Milan, Italy which had scheduled a performance with the dancer, subsequently canceled the show.

In December 2024, Polunin announced plans to leave Russia, stating “my soul is not in its place”.
