= Russian State Ballet of Siberia =

Classical ballet company in Krasnoyarsk, Russia

The Russian State Ballet of Siberia, is a classical ballet company based at the Krasnoyarsk State Opera and Ballet Theatre, in Krasnoyarsk, Russia. Founded in 1978 by graduates of the choreographic schools of Moscow, St. Petersburg, Kyiv, Novosibirsk and Yekaterinburg.

== Repertoire ==
The Russian State Ballet of Siberia began touring the UK in 2002. They were in the midst of their 20th anniversary UK tour on 24 February 2022, when Russia invaded Ukraine; consequently many performances were cancelled. As of 2024 they have not returned to the UK due to the ongoing war. Their repertoire included Coppélia, The Nutcracker, Swan Lake, The Sleeping Beauty, Romeo and Juliet, Cinderella and Giselle.
