= Jorma Elo =

Finnish choreographer (b. 1961)

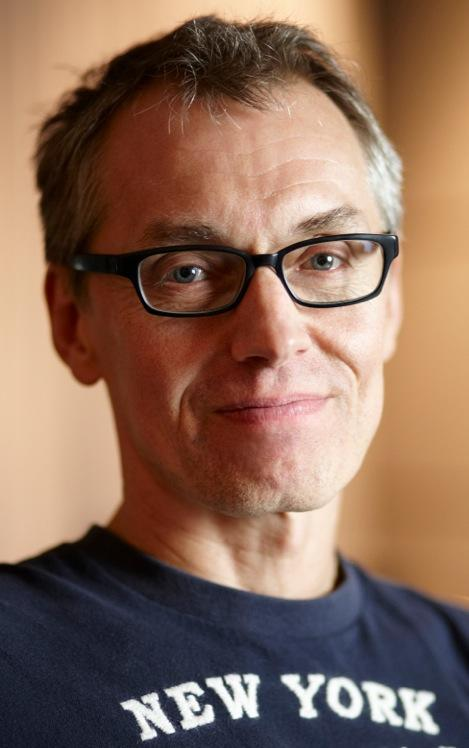
- Choreographer Jorma Elo.
- Born: August 30, 1961 (age 64); Helsinki, Finland

Jorma Elo is a contemporary choreographer.

== Early life ==
He was born 30 August 1961 in Helsinki, Finland. His father, Jaakko Elo, is a urological surgeon, mother Ruth Elo née Carlstedt, a dentist. Jorma Elo's partner since 1994 is Nancy Euverink who has also been assistant to Elo.

As a schoolboy, Elo wanted to be an ice hockey player, despite this he began studying modern and jazz dance at 12. At the age of 13 he was enrolled in Finnish National Ballet School for classical training. Later, in 1979–80, he studied in the Kirov Ballet School (Vaganova Academy), which under the Soviet era was the name of the Maryinsky Ballet School in St. Petersburg.

== Dancer ==
Elo was signed by the Finnish National Ballet at 16, and acquired experience not only of stage, but also of opera and ballet production processes. He danced with the Finnish National Ballet from 1978 to 1984. In 1983 he also completed his compulsory military service. In 1980 he attended Varna International Ballet Competition and 1984 he was a finalist in Helsinki International Ballet Competition.

Elo joined the Swedish Cullberg Ballet 1984 for six years. The modernist Cullberg Ballet led by choreographer Mats Ek was part of Riksteatern, the Swedish State Theater Organisation. It toured mostly in Sweden and the Nordic Countries.

In 1990, Elo joined Netherlands Dance Theatre where he worked with choreographers such as Jiri Kylian, Hans van Manen, Ohad Naharin, and William Forsythe.

NDT produced a great volume of new dance works during the 1990s and toured every year in all continents. During this time Elo met Nancy Euverink, a dancer of the company, and they became a couple in 1994.

Elo's active stage career lasted 26 years. He gave his last public performances in 2004.

== Choreographer ==
Elo debuted as a choreographer in 2000 with “The View from Over Here” and “Blank Snow” (Alberta Ballet). After 2004 he has worked in the US and been a resident since 2010, although he also kept his home in the Netherlands. At the beginning he worked as a freelancer for a variety of dance companies, but in 2005 he was appointed the Resident Choreographer of Boston Ballet. In addition to Boston Ballet he has also worked with New York City Ballet, San Francisco Ballet, American Ballet Theatre, the Royal Danish Ballet, Stuttgart Ballet, Nederlands Dans Theater, Vienna State Opera Ballet, Finnish National Ballet, Aspen Santa Fe Ballet and Hubbard Street Dance Chicago.

Up to 2012 Elo has choreographed more than 50 ballets, both new choreographies for classic ballet scores like Stravinsky's Pulcinella and completely new ones for example with Sibelius´ music. He has also designed costumes, stage settings, lighting and video effects for his ballets. in the spring 2012 he is working on a new creation for the Bolshoi Ballet titled Dream of Dream to be premiered June 29, 2012 at the Bolshoi Theatre in Moscow.

Elo makes synthesis of classic background and modern dance. He emphasizes athleticism and dynamic movement and speaks about Primal Contact with his body and the music. Elo considers it useful to give every dancer various roles so that every member of the company has opportunity to personal work. Many dancers have said that Elo is an empathetic personality without any need to promote his own ego.

Elo has received numerous accolades for his choreography, including a mention by New York Times dance critic Anna Kisselgoff as a “talent to follow”. In 2005 he won a choreographic prize at the Helsinki International Ballet Competition. In 2006 he won the Choo-San Goh Choreographic Award and that same year Pointe Magazine named him a Dance VIP. In 2011, he was awarded the Prix Benois de la Danse as choreographer. "ONE/end/ONE" for Houston Ballet earned him the first ever Rudolf Nureyev Prize for New Dance in 2011.

Most recently Elo has been celebrated by critics for his evening of dance at Boston Ballet entitled “Elo Experience”. The performance featured eight selections from Elo's repertoire, the remaining sections illustrated by Boston Ballet's premiere dancers Jeffrey Cirio and Larissa Ponomarenko.

== Choreographic works ==
- The View from Over here (2000)
- Blank Snow (2000) Alberta Ballet
- Faun/Spectre (2001) Alberta Ballet
- Twisted Shadow (2002) Finnish National Ballet
- Sharp side of Dark (2002) Boston Ballet
- 1st Flash (2003) NDT 1
- Red with Me (2003) Pecs Ballet (Hungary)
- Black Shine (2003) Gala Stockholm
- DREAMTEAM (2003) Stockholm 59 North
- Happy is Happy (2004) Finnish National Ballet
- One Cue (2004) Pecs Ballet (Hungary)
- Plan to B (2004) Boston Ballet
- Drive (2004) Stockholm 59 North
- Cut to Drive (2004) Norwegian National Ballet(NOKO)
- Plan to A (2004) NDT 1
- Two Fast (2004) Finnish National Ballet
- Hammer (2005) Ballet Debrecen (Hungary)
- OFFCORE (2005) Finnish National Ballet
- Carmen (2006) Boston Ballet
- Slice to Sharp (2006) New York City Ballet
- Slice to Core (2006) Ballet Nurnberg
- Scenes View 2 (2006) Ballet X (Philadelphia)
- Glow- Stop (2006) American Ballet Theatre
- Pointe OFF (2006) Aspen Santa Fe Ballet ( Colorado)
- 10 to Hyper M.(2006) Royal Danish Ballet
- Nijinsky (film)(2007) Finnish TV
- From all Sides (2007) Hubbard St. dance company ( Chicago)
- C. to C. (2007) American Ballet Theatre
- Brake the Eyes (2007) Boston Ballet
- Brake Green (2007) Norwegian National Ballet
- Lost by Last (2007) Royal Ballet of Flanders (Antwerp)
- Lost on Slow (2008) Royal Danish Ballet
- In on Blue (2008) Boston Ballet
- Double Evil (2008) San Francisco Ballet
- Red Sweet (2008) Aspen Santa Fe Ballet
- Death and the Maiden (2008) Norwegian National Ballet
- Requiem (Mozart) (2008) Gothenburg Ballet (Sweden)
- Suite Murder (2008) Finnish National Ballet
- Sacre du Printemps (2009) Boston Ballet
- Bitter Suite (2009) Hubbard Street Dance Chicago
- Round about Tim, Solo for Tim Mathiakis (2010) for gala in Greece, Athens
- Midsummer Nights Dream (2010) full evening work, Vienna state Opera Ballet, Austria
- One Concerto (2010) Boston Ballet school, Boston
- Pur ti Miro (2010), National Ballet of Canada, Toronto
- RED in 3 (2010), Stuttgart Ballet, Stuttgart, Germany
- Touch (2010 October) Norwegian National Ballet, Oslo, Norway
- ONE Overture, Solo for Maria Kochetkova (2011) Reflections project Moscow, Bolshoi/ Orange County USA
- Elo Experience full evening work (2011 March) Boston Ballet, USA
- Pulcinella, with Philadelphia Symphony Orchestra (2011) Pennsylvania Ballet, Philadelphia USA
- Golden Partita, Basler Ballett (2011) Basel, Switzerland
- ONE/end/ONE Houston Ballet (2011) Houston Texas, USA
- Over Glow, Aspen Santa Fe Ballet (2011) Wolftrap Washington DC
- Kings 2 Ends (2011) Scottish Ballet Edinburgh, Scotland UK
- Still of King, Solo for Marcello Gomes (ABT) Kings of Dance project (2011) prem. Moscow, Russia, Stanislavsky Theatre
- Sharper side of Dark, Boston Ballet, premiere Boston 2012
- Awake Only, Boston Ballet, premiere Boston 2012
- Killer Sweet, Royal Ballet of Flanders, Belgium, premiere Antwerp 2012
