= David Dawson (choreographer) =

British choreographer

David Dawson (born 4 March 1972) is a British dancer and choreographer. His style is based on the vocabulary of classical ballet and, though Dawson disagrees with the association, his style is often said to be influenced by William Forsythe.

== Education and dance career ==
Born in London, Dawson began dancing at seven and received his early training at the Rona Hart School of Dance and the Arts Educational School. He went on to train at the Royal Ballet School, in dance and choreography.

In 1991 he received the Alicia Markova Award, won the Prix de Lausanne, and was offered a contract by the Birmingham Royal Ballet. Under the direction of Sir Peter Wright, he performed leading roles in classical repertoire as well as in ballets by Sir Kenneth MacMillan, Sir Frederick Ashton, Sir Peter Wright, and David Bintley. He was nominated as Best Newcomer of the Season by 'Dance & Dancers' magazine in 1992.

In 1994, he joined the English National Ballet under the direction of Derek Deane as a soloist. A year later, he moved to Amsterdam to perform with Wayne Eagling's Dutch National Ballet. Here Dawson was able to continue dancing in classical productions as well as explore more neo-classical and modern repertoire in the works of George Balanchine, Rudi van Dantzig, and Hans van Manen. Dawson worked with choreographers, and created roles, in new ballets by Sir Kenneth MacMillan, Glen Tetley, Twyla Tharp, Christopher Bruce, Wayne Eagling, Ted Brandsen, Mauro Bigonzetti, Itzik Gallili, Redha, and Christopher D'Amboise.

He eventually joined Ballet Frankfurt where he worked with William Forsythe, and performed for two more years before deciding to devote his time to creating new works. Dawson ended his dance career in 2002.

== Choreographic career ==
In 1997 Dawson choreographed his first ballet in collaboration with the Dutch National Ballet. His creative journey was spurred by the then-artistic director, Wayne Eagling, who encouraged him to participate in the company's choreographic workshop. This initial experience laid the foundation for Dawson's inaugural major creation for the company's main stage, "A Million Kisses to my Skin," which premiered in 2000.

In 2003, he received the Prix Benois de la Danse for his outstanding choreographic work. Additionally, he earned a nomination for the UK Critics' Circle National Dance Award in the category of Best Classical Choreographer, thanks to his production titled "The Grey Area." Notably, Dawson became the first British choreographer to craft a ballet, "Reverence," for the Mariinsky (Kirov) Ballet, which was honored with the Golden Mask Award for Best Choreographer.

He was the recipient of the Choo San Goh Award for Choreography, for his work in "The Gentle Chapters." He received a nomination for the dance prize of the Netherlands, The Golden Swan Award, as Best Choreographer for "00:00." His reimagining of "Faun(e)" for the English National Ballet's Ballets Russes Festival at Sadler's Wells in London led to nominations for the UK Critics' Circle National Dance Award and the Prix Benois de la Danse Choreography Award in 2010. Notably, David Dawson and his work "Faun(e)" were featured in the BBC documentary titled "For Art's Sake: The Story of the Ballets Russes."

His full-length "Giselle" had its world premiere at the Dresden Semperoper. Among his notable works are "day4," "On the Nature of Daylight," "The World According to Us," "Morning Ground," "Das Verschwundene|The Disappeared," "A Sweet Spell of Oblivion," "dancingmadlybackwards," "timelapse/(Mnemosyne)," and "The Third Light."

Between 2004 and 2012, David Dawson held the role of resident choreographer for the Dutch National Ballet, the Dresden Semperoper Ballet, and the Royal Ballet of Flanders.

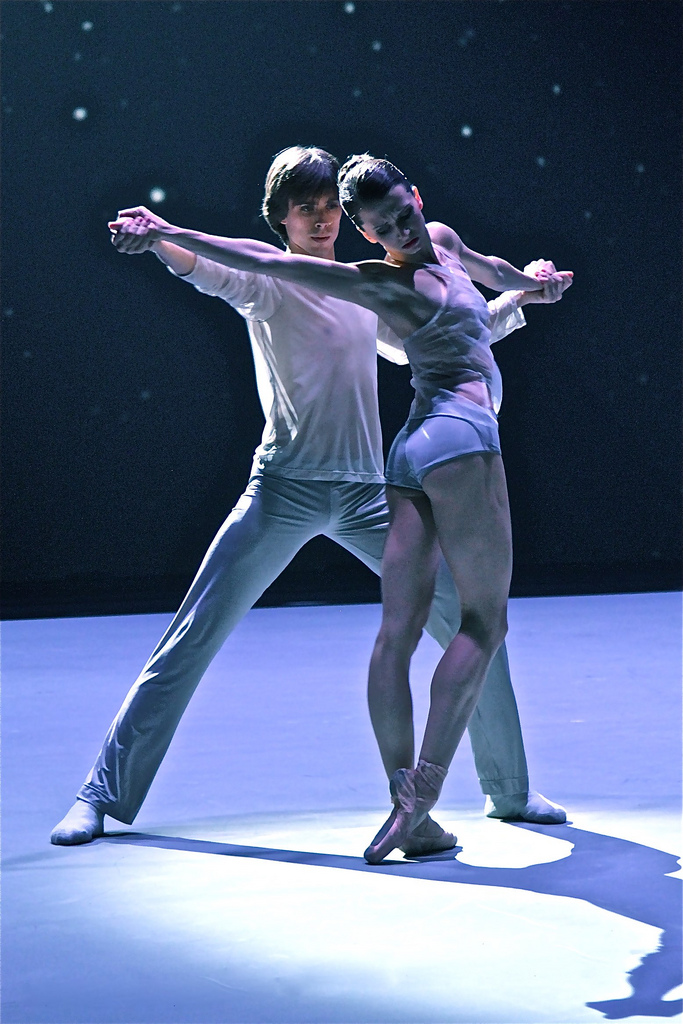
Anna Tihomirova and Artem Ovcharenko (Bolshoi Ballet), "The Grey Area", Moscow, 2012

== Creations ==
- 2015 - Empire Noir
- 2015 - Tristan + Isolde
- 2013 - The Human Seasons
- 2013 - Opus.11
- 2013 - 5
- 2013 - Overture
- 2012 - day4
- 2011 - somewhere music is playing...
- 2011 - timelapse/(Mnemosyne)
- 2010 - dancingmadlybackwards
- 2010 - The Third Light
- 2009 - Faun(e)
- 2009 - The World According to Us
- 2008 - Giselle
- 2007 - On the Nature of Daylight
- 2007 - A Sweet Spell of Oblivion
- 2006 - Das Verschwundene|The Disappeared
- 2006 - The Gentle Chapters
- 2005 - Reverence
- 2004 - Morning Ground
- 2004 - 00:00
- 2002 - The Grey Area
- 2000 - A Million Kisses to my Skin
- 1999 - Psychic Whack
- 1998 - Step|Study
- 1998 - Scenes from an Interview
- 1997 - Born Slippy

== Honours ==
- 2014 - UK Critics' Circle National Dance Nominee as Best Classical Choreographer for the creation of The Human Seasons (The winners will be announced at a lunchtime ceremony to be held at a central London venue on Monday, 26 January 2015)
- 2013 - Golden Swan Award Nominee for Best New Production in The Netherlands for the creation of Overture
- 2010 - Prix Benois de la Danse Choreography Nominee as Best Choreographer for the creation of Faun(e)
- 2010 - UK Critics’ Circle National Dance Award Nominee as Best Classical Choreographer for the creation of Faun(e)
- 2006 - Golden Mask Award (Russian Federation) Winner as Best Choreographer for the creation of Reverence
- 2006 - Choo San Goh Choreography Award Winner for the creation of The Gentle Chapters
- 2005 - UK Critics’ Circle National Dance Award Nominee as Best Classical Choreographer for The Grey Area
- 2003 - Prix Benois de la Danse Choreography Winner for Best Choreographer for the creation of The Grey Area
- 2003 - Golden Swan Award Nominee for Best New Production in The Netherlands for the creation of 00:00
- 1992 - Best Newcomer of the Season Nominee by Dance & Dancers magazine
- 1991 - Prix de Lausanne Winner
- 1991 - Alicia Markova Award Winner
