= Anastasia Abramova =

Russian ballerina

- Anastasia Abramova as Jeanne in the Flames of Paris, Bolshoi Theater, 1933
- Born: 17 June 1902; Moscow, Russian Empire
- Died: 26 June 1985 (aged 83); Moscow, Soviet Union
- Occupation: Ballerina
- Years active: 1922–1948
- Career
- Former groups: Bolshoi Ballet

Anastasia Abramova (Russian: Анастаси́я Ива́новна Абра́мова; 17 June 1902 – 26 June 1985) was a Russian ballerina of the Moscow ballet school.

She was the sister of Russian ballet critic Alexandr Abramov (alias Truvit; ru: Александр Трувит).

== Early life and education ==
Abramova was born in 1902 in Moscow, Russian Empire. She started to attend the Bolshoi Ballet school in 1910. At the Bolshoi, she trained under Yekaterina Geltzer, Ekaterina Vazem and Vasily Tikhomirov. Abramova graduated in 1917.

== Work ==
After graduation, she worked at the Bolshoi Ballet. She performed with Valentina Kudriavtseva, Liubov Bank, and Nina Podgoretskaya (Igor Moiseyev’s the first wife, the civil marriage) - these were four stars of the Moscow ballet in the 1920s and their lives were similar.

Anastasia Abramova was professional partner of Asaf Messerer. She worked with director Alexander Alexeyevich Gorsky and Vasily Tikhomirov. Her debut was in 1922 performing in La fille mal gardée as Lise. Other notable performances includes The Red Poppy (as Tao-Hoa), Cinderella (as a fairy and the Stepmother), and Flames of Paris (as Jeanne). She also performed in The Little Humpbacked Horse, Les petits riens of A. Gorsky after Jean-Georges Noverre’choreography (1922), The Nutcracker (as Masha), Petrushka (as Dancing Girl), Coppélia (as Swanhilde, 1924), Footballer (as Cleaner streets, the main role; 1930), etc.

She retired in 1948.

At this time two ballet school-direction existed in Russian ballet – of Petersburg (Leningrad) and of Moscow. They passed into the USSR from the Russian Empire. School of ballet in St Petersburg developed high graceful dance, and the Moscow school was engaged a character dance. But in the 1930s under Stalin's orders, a group of Leningrad dancers arrived in Moscow to replace Moscow dancers. Subsequently, the Moscow school ceased to exist. Many Moscow dancers and choreographers have left the Bolshoi theatre. And those who could not find another job, continued to be listed in the Bolshoi theatre, but did not have roles. Such a fate was in Abramova. Four stars of the Moscow ballet - Anastasia Abramova, Valentina Kudriavtseva, Lyubov Bank, and Nina Podgoretskaya - were barred from taking part in the performances.

In 1947, they simultaneously received as compensation for a broken ballet destiny the title of Honored Artist of the RSFSR and were immediately fired.
