= Yuri Fayer =

Soviet conductor (1890–1971)

Yuri Fayer Юрий Файер
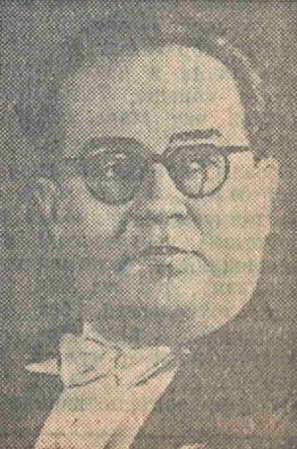
- Fayer in 1941

Background information
- Born: Aria Fayer; January 17, 1890; Kiev, Russian Empire (present-day Ukraine)
- Died: August 3, 1971 (aged 81) Moscow, Russian SFSR, Soviet Union
- Genres: Classical
- Occupation: Conductor
- Instrument: Violin

Yuri Fyodorovich Fayer (Note: Russian: Юрий Фёдорович Файер, romanized: Yury Fyodorovich Fayer, sometimes given as Faier; Ukrainian: Юрій Федорович Файєр, romanized: Yurii Fedorovych Faiier) (17 January [O.S. 5 January] 1890 – 3 August 1971, born Aria) (Note: Russian: Ария Фаер, romanized: Ariya Fayer) was a Soviet conductor specializing in ballet. He was the chief ballet conductor at the Bolshoi Theatre from 1923 to 1963.

Fayer's range extended from the classical repertoire (he conducted over 400 performances of Tchaikovsky's Swan Lake alone) through to new ballets by composers such as Shostakovich and Prokofiev. His world premieres included two of Prokofiev's ballets: Cinderella (1945) and (posthumously) The Tale of the Stone Flower (1954). He was held in greet esteem by such dancers as Galina Ulanova and Maya Plisetskaya.

== Biography ==
Yuri Fayer was born in Kiev on 17 January 1890 (ns). He was an early starter on the violin, giving his first concert at age 11, joining the Kiev Opera orchestra at 14, and entering the Moscow Conservatory at 16. He was unable to complete his studies, as he needed to work to make ends meet. He worked at the opera house in Riga and formed his own touring orchestra, before returning to Moscow in 1914 and re-entering the Conservatory, while also playing violin at the Bolshoi Theatre. His earlier experience as a conductor stood him in good stead, and before long he was asked to conduct at the Bolshoi, where he became an institution. In 1923 he became chief ballet conductor at the Bolshoi, a post he retained for 40 years, until 1963.

On Christmas Eve 1925, he conducted the Bolshoi orchestra in works by Beethoven, Litolff and Tchaikovsky to accompany the world premiere of Sergei Eisenstein's film Battleship Potemkin. (The film's official soundtrack, composed by Edmund Meisel, was not heard until its Berlin premiere in 1926.)

In 1933, he conducted the world premiere of the ballet The Flames of Paris, choreography by Vasili Vainonen, music by Boris Asafyev.

Fayer met frequently with Sergei Prokofiev while he was writing his ballet Romeo and Juliet. The composer's original conception was one in which the protagonists do not die. Yuri Fayer was one of those who convinced the composer to change the ending. He led the Bolshoi Ballet's first staging of the ballet (it had had its world premiere in Czechoslovakia).

In November 1945, he directed the world premiere of Prokofiev's ballet Cinderella.

In February 1954, eleven months after the composer's death, saw Fayer premiering Prokofiev's ballet The Tale of the Stone Flower.

Gennady Rozhdestvensky was Fayer's assistant conductor from 1951 to 1961. They were jointly nominated for the 1958 Academy Award for Best Music, Scoring of a Musical Picture for the film The Bolshoi Ballet.

Apart from his world premieres, Fayer directed the first Bolshoi Theatre performances of many ballets, including:

- Asafyev's The Fountain of Bakhchisarai (1936)
- Minkus's Don Quixote (1940)
- Glière's The Red Poppy (1949; he worked with Glière during the writing of the work, and it was he who suggested using the folksong "Little Apple" in the final Russian Sailors Dance)
- Glière'sThe Bronze Horseman
- Shostakovich's The Limpid Stream
- Khachaturian's Gayane (1957) and Spartacus (1958).

In later years he became almost blind but continued to conduct. He retired in 1963. He died on 3 August 1971.

== Honours ==
- People's Artist of the USSR (1951)
- Two Stalin Prizes first degree (1946, 1947)
- Two Stalin Prizes second degree (1941, 1950)

== Recordings ==
- Adolphe Adam: Giselle, Orchestra of the Royal Opera House, Covent Garden
- Léo Delibes, Coppelia, Orchestra of the Bolshoi Theatre
- Alexander Glazunov, Raymonda Suite
- Glazunov: Baryshnya-sluzhanka [Барышня-служанка] (Les ruses d'amour), Op. 61
- Reinhold Glière, The Red Poppy, Bolshoi Theatre Orchestra
- Sergei Prokofiev: Cinderella, Bolshoi Theatre Orchestra
- Pyotr Ilyich Tchaikovsky: Suite from Swan Lake
- Various – The Best of the Bolshoi Ballet
