= Rhie =

Rhie is a Korean surname, variant of Lee. Notable people with the name include:

- Arang Rhie, South Korean bioinformatician
- Sun Hong Rhie (1955–2013), Korean-American astrophysicist
- Ye-One Rhie (born 1987), German politician
