= Mikhailovsky Theatre =

Russian opera and ballet theatre in Saint Petersburg

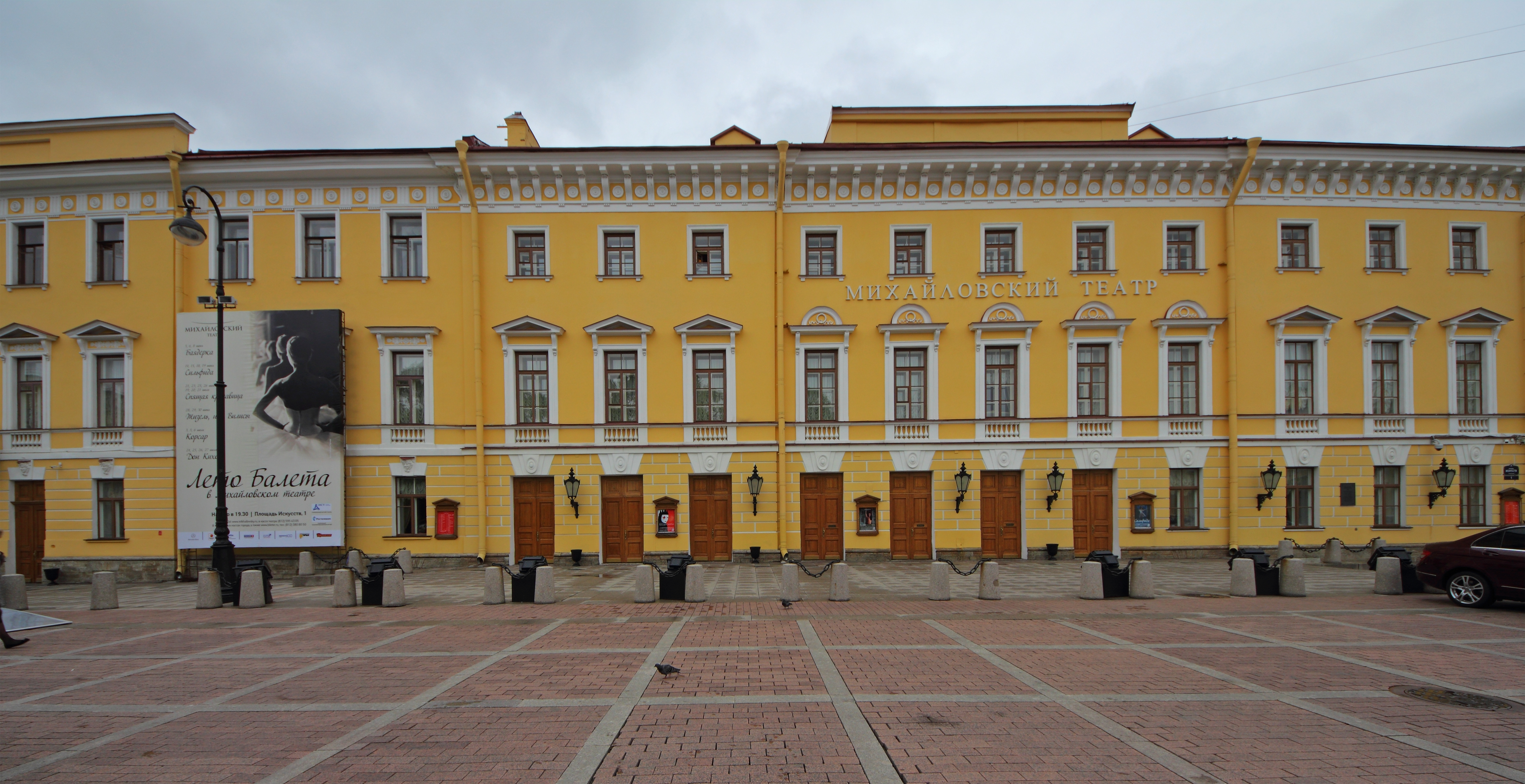
- Interactive map of the Mikhailovsky Theatre area
- Former names: Ex-Mikhailovsky Theatre (1918–1920); State Academic Comic Opera Theatre (1920); Maly Operny Teatr (1921–1926); Leningrad State Academic Maly Opera Theatre (1926–1989)
- Alternative names: The St Petersburg Mussorgsky State Academic Opera and Ballet Theatre—Mikhailovsky Theatre

General information
- Location: Saint Petersburg, Russia, 1, Arts Square
- Coordinates: 59°56′16″N 30°19′46″E

Website
- mikhailovsky.ru

The Mikhailovsky Theatre (Russian: Миха́йловский теа́тр) is one of Russia's oldest opera and ballet houses. It was founded in 1833 and occupies a Brulleau-designed building on 1, Arts Square in Saint Petersburg. It is named after Grand Duke Michael Pavlovich of Russia. Since 1989, it has borne the Modest Mussorgsky name. Since 1991 it has officially been named The St Petersburg Mussorgsky State Academic Opera and Ballet Theatre—Mikhailovsky Theatre.

== History ==
=== Before 1871 ===
The theatre was established in 1833 by decree of Tsar Nicholas I.

Before the 1917 Revolution, the Mikhailovsky did not have its own resident company. Performances were given either by a French company, hired by the Russian Imperial Theatres, or at the end of the century by the Mariinsky Theatre and Alexandrinsky Theatre companies.

When the Bolsheviks took power the French company was forced to leave Russia, and in 1917 the Mikhailovsky Theatre was closed.

=== Communist era ===
On 6 March 1918 the theatre was reopened as an opera theatre. Shortly afterwards the Mikhailovsky started changing its names: in 1918–20 it was called the Ex-Mikhailovsky Theatre, in 1920 it was renamed to the State Academic Comic Opera Theatre, in 1921 the theatre changed its name to the Maly Operny Teatr (Little Opera Theatre), in 1926 it got the name of the Leningrad State Academic Maly Opera Theatre, MALEGOT for short. New management and artists followed. From 1920 to 1930 the Maly Operny Teatr established itself as one of the leading experimental stages in Russian new musical theatre. Shostakovich made his debut at the Maly Operny: Samuil Samosud conducted world premiere performances of his The Nose and Lady Macbeth of the Mtsensk District, the famous Vsevolod Meyerhold production of The Queen of Spades was staged there, and the world premiere of Prokofiev's epic opera War and Peace took place on the theatre's stage on 12 June 1946.

=== 1930: Creation of the ballet company ===
In 1930s Russian choreographer Fyodor Lopukhov founded the ballet company of the Theatre. The first ballet premiere, Harlequinade, choreographed by Lopukhov, took place on 6 June 1933.

=== The 2000s revival ===
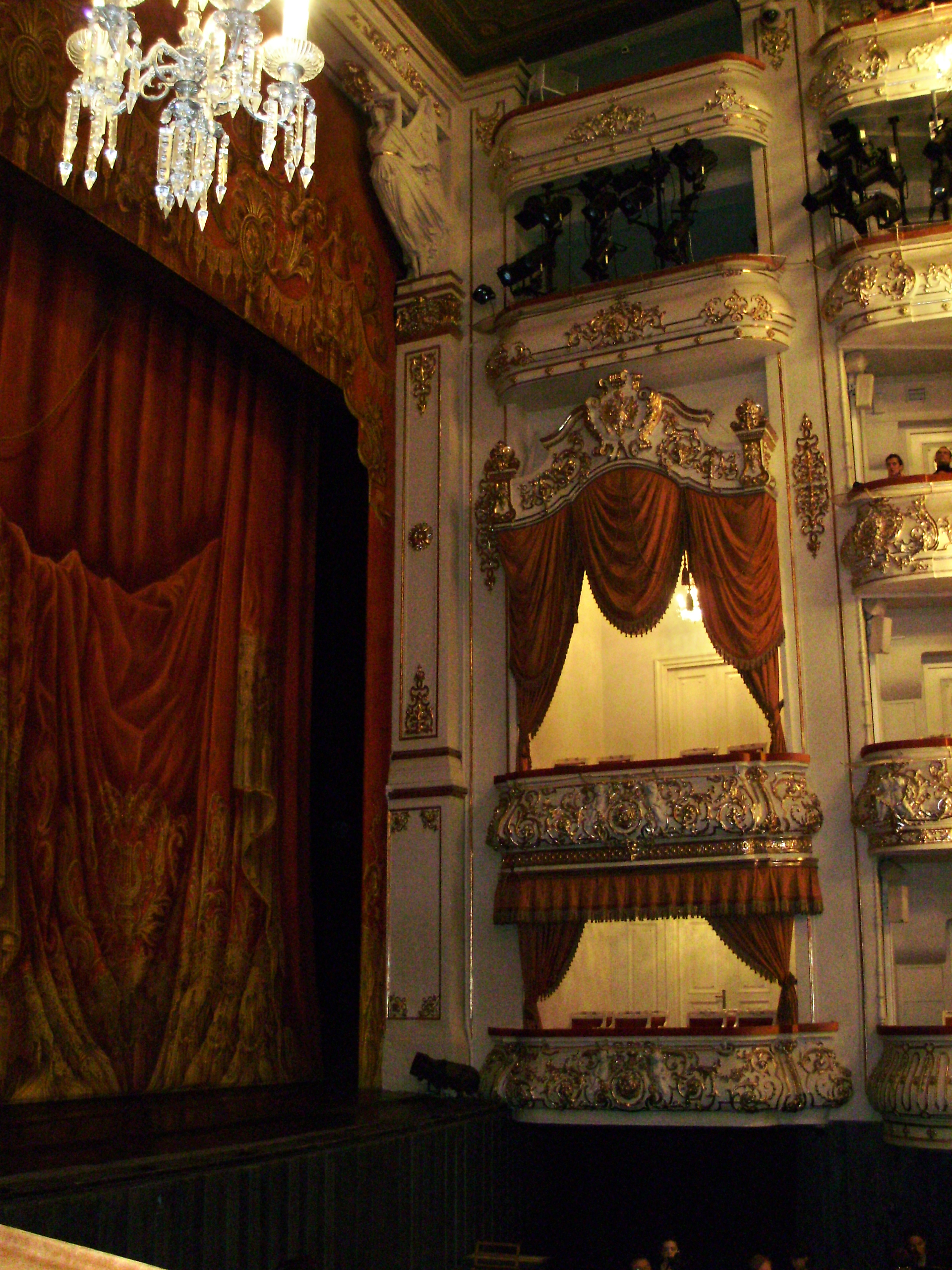
The interior

From 1989 to 2007, the theatre bore the name of Modest Mussorgsky, subsequently returning to its original name the Mikhailovsky Theatre.

In 2007, in what was seen as a controversial move, Russian businessman Vladimir Kekhman was appointed as General Director of the theatre. Vladimir Kekhman's strategy was to spend prolific amounts of money on ballet stars to build the Theatre's popularity.

He built a business-based organizational structures to the Ballet, donated 1 billion roubles ($40m US) for renovation of the building, and invited Elena Obraztsova and Farouk Ruzimatov to coordinate the artistic revival of the Mikhailovsky. In 2007, Elena Obraztsova was appointed Artistic Director of the Mikhailovsky Opera and Farouk Ruzimatov became Artistic Director of the Mikhailovsky Ballet. However, Obraztsova resigned in 2008 and Ruzimatov in 2009.

The ballet company of the Mikhailovsky Theatre made its London debut in July 2008 in London Coliseum arranged by the British ex-dancer Gavin Roebuck. This season helped bring the company international recognition and led to a nomination for the Best Foreign Dance Company Award at the National Dance Awards in 2008, though Mikhailovsky lost out to the New York City Ballet.

Also in 2013, the Mikhailovsky Opera made its debut at the Savonlinna Opera Festival, and, in November 2014, the Mikhailovsky Ballet debuted in the US at New York's Lincoln Center.

In October 2012, Vladimir Kekhman was declared bankrupt at London's High Court of Justice, but he assured that the operation of the Mikhailovsky Theatre was not at risk. In April 2013, top ballet dancer Natalia Osipova left the company to join The Royal Ballet in London, after she had made the headlines in December 2011 for choosing the Mikhailosky Theatre over the Bolshoi Theatre.

In 2015, the tenor Neil Shicoff was appointed Chief of the Mikhailovsky Opera, and from July 2017 till July 2018, the bass Paata Burchuladze was Chief of the Mikhailovsky Opera.

Mikhail Messerer resigned from the Theatre in 2019.

== Ballet company ==
Repertoire

- Don Quixote – Mikhail Messerer's version
- Duende – choreography by Nacho Duato
- Giselle – Nikita Dolgushin's version
- Class Concert – choreography by Asaf Messerer
- Le Corsaire – Mikhail Messerer's version
- Laurencia – Mikhail Messerer's version
- Flames of Paris – Mikhail Messerer's version
- Swan Lake – Mikhail Messerer's version
- La Bayadère – Nacho Duato's version
- La Fille mal gardée – choreography by Ashton - staged by Mikhail Messerer and Michael O'Hare
- Cipollino – choreography by Genrikh Mayorov
- Cinderella – Mikhail Messerer's version
- Nunc Dimittis – choreography by Nacho Duato
- Without Words – choreography by Nacho Duato
- White Darkness – choreography by Nacho Duato
- Bolero – choreography by Ivan Vasiliev
- Coppelia – Mikhail Messerer's version
- The Bronze Idol (based on the Bronze Horseman) – choreography by Lar Lubovitch
- Na Floresta – choreography by Nacho Duato
- Love is All Around – choreography by Ivan Vasiliev
- Multiplicity. Forms of Silence and Emptiness – choreography by Nacho Duato
- Morphine – choreography by Ivan Vasiliev
- Invisible – choreography by Nacho Duato
- Prelude – choreography by Nacho Duato
- La Halte de cavalerie – choreography by Piotr Gusev after Marius Petipa
- A Christmas Carol (based on the book by Charles Dickens) – choreography by Ivan Vasiliev
- Romeo and Juliet – choreography by Nacho Duato
- La Sylphide - choreography by August Bournonville
- Blind Affair – choreography by Ivan Vasiliev
- The Sleeping Beauty – choreography by Nacho Duato
- The Nutcracker – choreography by Nacho Duato

== Awards ==
- 2013: Best Ballet Company award at the National Dance Awards
