= Marina Kazimirovna Osipova =

Russian ballet instructor, choreographer, artistic director

Marina Osipova
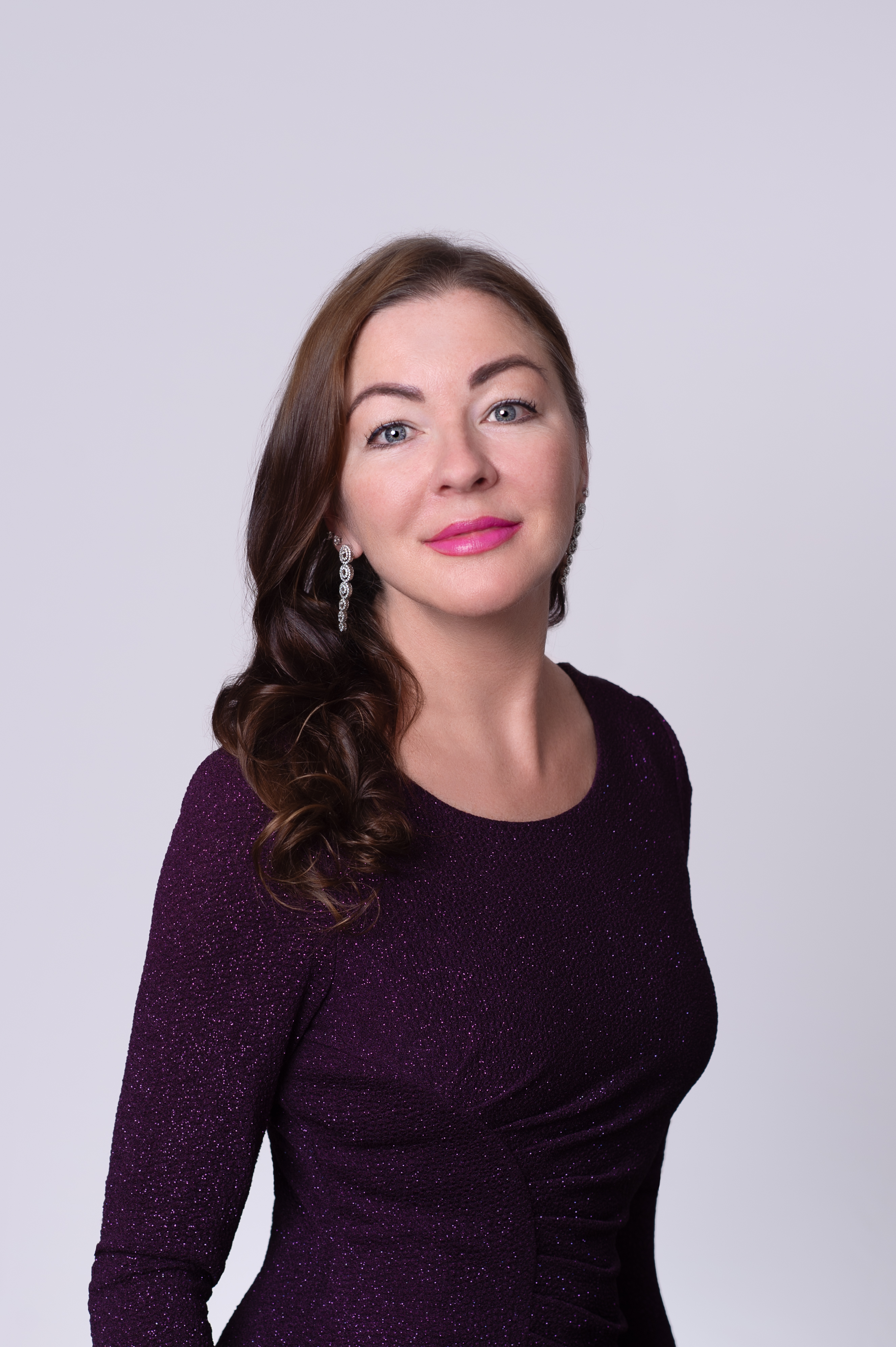
- Born: 1974 (age 51–52); St. Petersburg, Russia
- Education: Vaganova Academy of Russian Ballet
- Occupations: Ballet instructor, choreographer, artistic director
- Years active: 1992–present
- Known for: Classical ballet teaching, choreography, dance education
- Notable work: Professional Training of Future Ballet Dancers to Perform Allegro
- Website: osipovaballetacademy.com

Marina Kazimirovna Osipova (Russian: Марина Казимировна Осипова; born in 1974 in St. Petersburg, Russia) is a ballet instructor, choreographer, artistic director, the author of methodology manuals and scientific articles on classical dance. Osipova authored "Professional Training of Future Ballet Dancers to Perform Allegro".

In 2005, Osipova graduated from the Vaganova Academy of Russian Ballet in St. Petersburg. From 1992 to 2012, she was a ballerina of the Russian Ballet Theatre and the St. Petersburg Mussorgsky State Academic Opera and Ballet Theatre - Mikhailovsky Theatre, performing leading roles in ballets such as Swan Lake, Giselle, The Nutcracker, and others. Since 2000, she has been a teacher of classical dance at the Vaganova Academy of Russian Ballet. She taught classical dance at the Vaganova Academy of Russian Ballet branch in Seoul, South Korea.

From 2013 to 2015, she was Deputy Artistic Director and Head of the Classical Dance Department at the Boris Eifman Dance Academy, St. Petersburg. In 2015 she was appointed to the Associate Professor of the Choreography Department at the Institute of Theatre Arts in Moscow. Since 2018, Osipova has taught ballet, classical and modern dance in California, USA. Member of the jury of dance competitions both in Russia and abroad.
