= Ivan Vasiliev =

Russian ballet dancer and choreographer

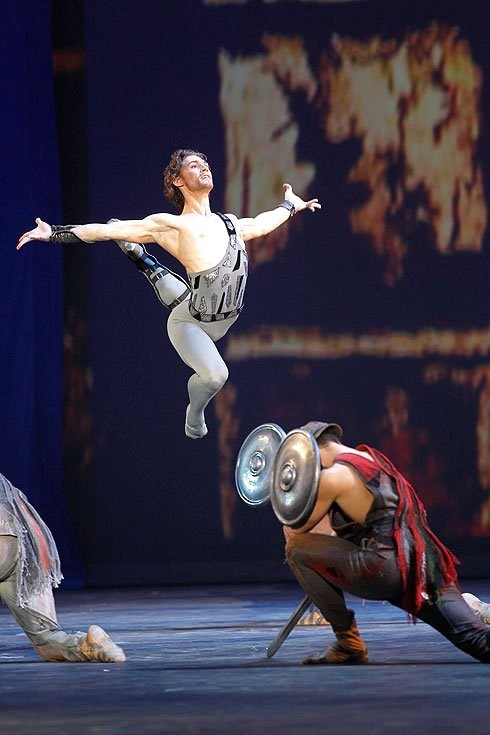
- Ivan Vasiliev in an extract from Spartacus, at the re-opening gala of the Bolshoi Theatre 28 October 2011
- Born: 9 January 1989 (age 37); Vladivostok, Russian SFSR, Soviet Union
- Occupation: Ballet dancer
- Career
- Current group: Mikhailovsky Theatre
- Former groups: Bolshoi Ballet

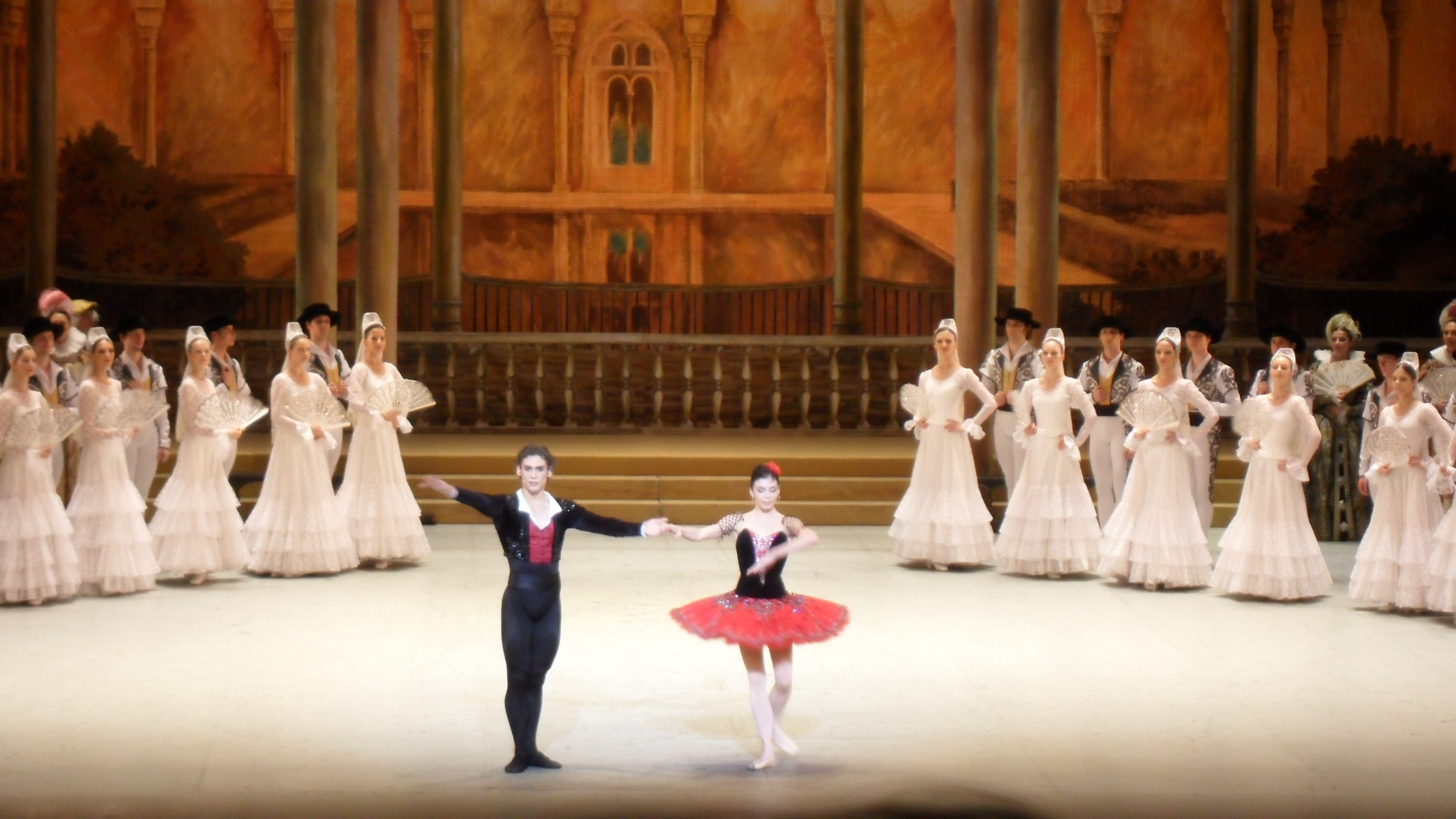
Natalia Osipova and Ivan Vasiliev in Don Quixote ballet

Ivan Vladimirovich Vasiliev (born 9 January 1989) is a Russian ballet dancer and choreographer. He graduated from the Bielorussian Ballet School in 2006.

Early on, he won prizes that include First Prize and Best Dancer Prize at the Arabesque-96 Ballet Competition in Perm in 2005, First Prize at the Moscow International Ballet Competition in 2006, Special Distinction of the Varna International Ballet Competition in 2006, Rising Star of Soul of Dance Award in 2008, one of "25 to Watch" of Dance Magazine 2008, Benois Prix de la Danse in 2009, Virtuosity Prize of International Dance Open in Saint Peterburg in 2010, followed by the Grand Prix the following year, Best Dancer of 2011 UK Critic's Award. In 2014 he was granted the title of "Honoured Artist of Russia". In 2015, by public poll, he was awarded Discovery of the Year QG Prize, for his first ballet evening as choreographer.

== Career ==
Vasiliev joined the Bolshoi Ballet in the end of 2006, as first soloist. When 2010 came to an end he had already performed the leading roles in Le Corsaire, Flames of Paris, Don Quixote, Giselle, La Fille Mal-Gardée, Spartacus, Petrouchka, The Nutcracker, La Esmeralda, La Bayadère and been promoted to the rank of principal of the Bolshoi Ballet.

Vasiliev and Natalia Osipova, his then-fiancée, left the Bolshoi in the end of 2011, their stated motivation being greater artistic freedom. They both became principals of the Mikhailovsky Theatre in Saint Petersburg. Vasiliev became a regular guest principal at the American Ballet Theatre, La Scala and the Bolshoi. He also performed leading roles in Mariinsky Theatre, Stanislavsky Theatre, Novosibirsk Theatre, English National Ballet, Bayrisches Staatsballet, and the Australian Ballet.
