= Lydia Lopokova =

Russian ballet dancer (1892–1981)

The Right Honourable The Lady Keynes
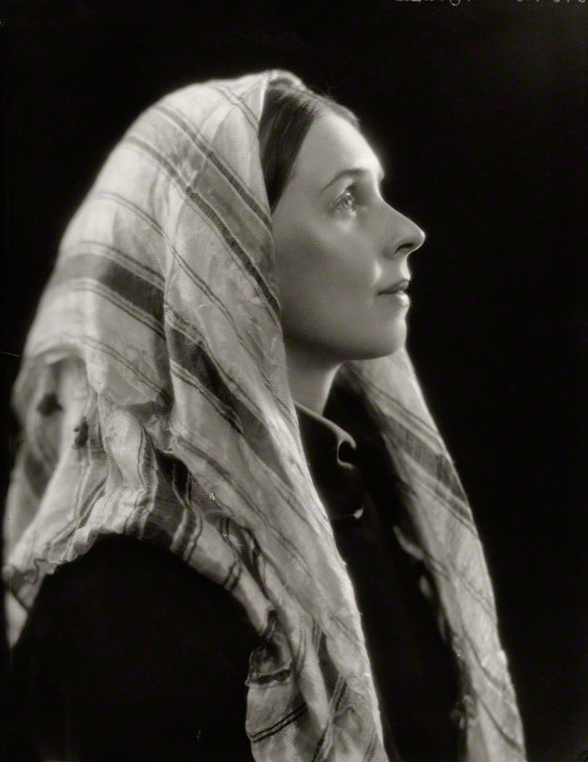
- Lydia Lopokova in 1922
- Born: Lidiya Vasilyevna Lopukhova; 21 October 1891; Saint Petersburg, Russian Empire
- Died: 8 June 1981 (aged 89); Seaford, East Sussex, England
- Occupation: Ballerina
- Title: Lady Keynes
- Spouses: Randolfo Barrocchi (m. 1916; ann. 1925) John Maynard Keynes (m. 1925)
- Relatives: Fyodor Lopukhov (brother)

Lydia Lopokova, Baroness Keynes (born Lidiya Vasilyevna Lopukhova, Russian: Лидия Васильевна Лопухова; 21 October 1891 – 8 June 1981) was a Russian ballerina famous during the early 20th century.

Lopokova trained at the Imperial Ballet School. She toured with the Ballets Russes in 1910, and rejoined them in 1916 after an interlude in the United States.

Lopokova married the English economist John Maynard Keynes in 1925 and was also known as the Lady Keynes. She largely disappeared from public view after Keynes's death in 1946 and spent her remaining years in Sussex.

== Early life ==
Lopokova was born in Saint Petersburg. Her father worked as the chief usher at the Alexandrinsky Theatre; her mother was of a Baltic-Scottish origin who spoke German. Four of the Lopukhov children became ballet dancers; one of them, Fyodor Lopukhov, was a chief choreographer for the Mariinsky Theatre from 1922 to 1935 and again from 1951 to 1956.

Lydia trained at the Imperial Ballet School, where she almost immediately became a star pupil. As a child she danced before the Emperor and his family, in productions such as the Fairy Doll and The Nutcracker; she also witnessed the events of Bloody Sunday at first hand. As she grew older "she responded instinctively to the expressive choreography of Mikhail Fokine, his rebellion against the stiff academicism of the classical style, and her chance came when she was chosen to join the Ballets Russes... on their European tour in 1910.... Diaghilev knocked a year off her age and promoted her as a child star." She stayed with the Ballets Russes only briefly, knowing that she had little future in Russia ("she was the wrong size and shape for the grand roles and there were already plenty of prima ballerinas in St. Petersburg").

== America and Europe ==
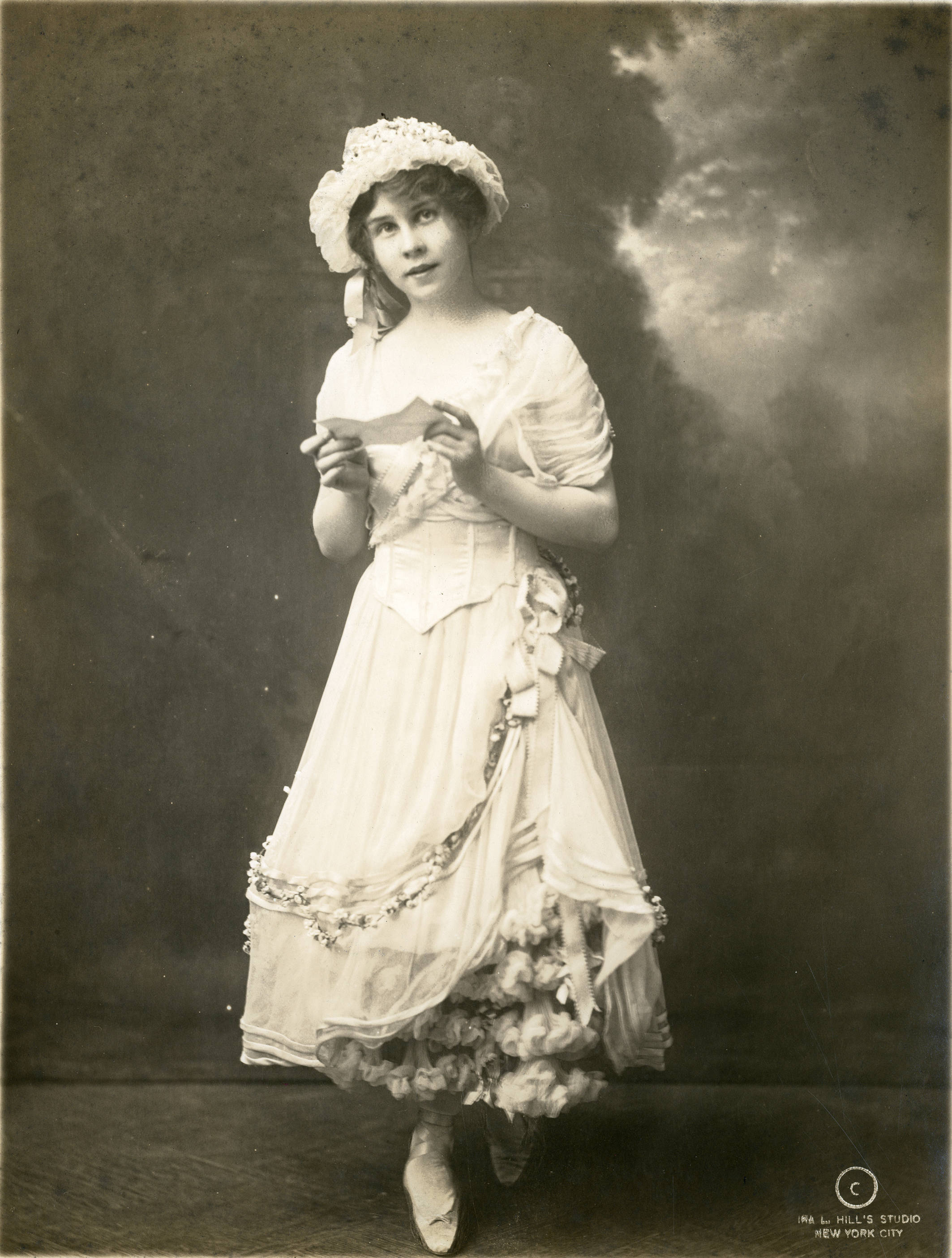
Lydia Lopokova, 1917

She accepted an American offer of 18,000 francs per month, sixty times more than she had earned in Russia, and after the summer tour left for the United States, where she remained for five years, enjoying tremendous success and legally changing her name to Lopokova in April 1914.

In 1915, while in New York, she had become engaged to the New York Morning Telegraph sportswriter Heywood Broun, later a member of the celebrated Algonquin Round Table coterie. When the Ballets Russes came to the United States in 1916 she broke off her engagement, and soon after married the company's Italian business manager, Randolfo Barrocchi. She danced regularly with the company, including with her former partner, Vaslav Nijinsky.

She toured with the Ballets Russes in America, Europe, South America and later in London. She first came to the attention of Londoners in The Good-humoured Ladies in 1918, and followed this with a raucous performance with Léonide Massine in the Can-Can of La Boutique fantasque. When her marriage to Barrocchi broke down in 1919, the dancer abruptly disappeared for a time, as she had done before in America. She also had an on-off affair with Igor Stravinsky, who composed for the Ballets Russes.

== Relationship with Keynes ==
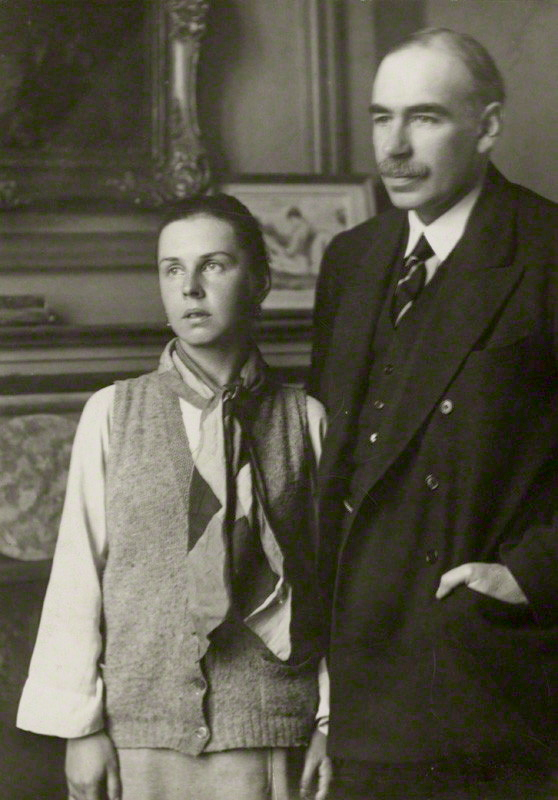
Lopokova with Keynes in the 1920s

In 1921, Diaghilev staged a lavish production of The Sleeping Beauty in which Lopokova danced the Lilac Fairy and Princess Aurora. The production was a flop, but it brought her to the attention of John Maynard Keynes. He "sat every night in the stalls, enchanted by Lydia as the Lilac Fairy casting spells over the cradle." The two soon became lovers, and they were married in 1925, once her divorce from Barrocchi had been obtained. Until now, Keynes's closest relationships had been with the members of the Bloomsbury group, especially Vanessa Bell and Duncan Grant, who had been the great love of his life. They and other members of the group, such as Virginia Woolf and Lytton Strachey, found Lydia difficult to accept and were resistant to her partnership with Keynes for many years even after their marriage took place. (Some of them later regretted their snobbery; E.M. Forster, for example, wrote: "How we all used to underestimate her.") However, she maintained friendships with many other members of London's cultural elite of the time, including T. S. Eliot and H. G. Wells. During these years she became a friend of Pablo Picasso, who drew her many times. Lopokova and Keynes hoped to have children, but this did not happen.

The couple spent their honeymoon in Sussex in 1925. A fortnight into the honeymoon they were briefly visited by the philosopher Ludwig Wittgenstein. Lydia remarked to Wittgenstein "What a beautiful tree", Wittgenstein responded glaringly asking "what do you mean?" which caused Lydia to burst into tears.

== Later life ==
Besides being involved in the early days of English ballet, Lopokova appeared on the stage in London and Cambridge from 1928, and was broadcast on the BBC as a presenter and in a number of acting roles; she read "The Red Shoes" over the BBC in 1935 (and a few years later reprised it for BBC television). Lopokova is represented as Terpsichore, the muse of dancing, in The Awakening of the Muses, a mosaic at the National Gallery, London, laid by Boris Anrep in 1933. Also in 1933 she danced her last ballet role, as Swanhilda in Coppélia, for the new Vic-Wells Ballet.

She lived with Keynes in London, Cambridge, and Sussex. "Lopokova was [Keynes's] partner in founding the Cambridge Arts Theatre, and in advising him on the constitution for the Arts Council; with his financial input she became a moving spirit in the Camargo Society, which led to the creation of a national ballet company." After her husband's collapse from an attack of angina in 1937, Lopokova devoted herself increasingly to taking care of his health. She supervised his diet and made sure he had enough rest; "without her constant attention and her joie de vivre, Keynes might not have made it to Bretton Woods."

== Death ==
After Keynes's death in 1946, she largely disappeared from public view and lived in Tilton House, Sussex for her remaining years. Richard Shone published a reminiscence of several visits to her there. Lopokova died in the Three Ways Nursing Home in Seaford in 1981, at 89.

== Cultural representations ==
Virginia Woolf based the character of Rezia in Mrs Dalloway in part on Lydia.

Lynn Seymour played Lydia in the 1993 film Wittgenstein, directed by Derek Jarman.

Wooing in Absence was performed by Natalia Makarova and Benjamin Whitrow, and directed by Patrick Garland, at Charleston Farmhouse and Tate Britain

The novel Mr Keynes' Revolution (ISBN 0993515835) (2020) by E. J. Barnes is about Keynes' and Lopokova's lives in the 1920s.

Lopokova is the central character in 'Firebird', the novel by Susan Sellers, which recounts Lydia's love affair with Keynes, her prickly reception from his friends in the Bloomsbury group, and their marriage, as well as narrating the story of Lydia's earlier life, from her childhood in the Imperial Ballet School through to her tours in America and beyond as a solo artist and celebrity.

Love Letters was performed with Helena Bonham Carter as Lopokova and Tobias Menzies as Keynes in July 2021 at Charleston Farmhouse, with a script crafted by reader-in-residence Holly Dawson..

Fellow ballerina Natalia Osipova portrayed Lopokova in the West End play The Standard of Living.

== Biographies ==
Maynard Keynes's nephew Milo Keynes wrote a biography, Lydia Lopokova (St. Martin's Press, 1983, ISBN 0312500394). Judith Mackrell published her biography, Bloomsbury Ballerina: Lydia Lopokova, Imperial Dancer and Mrs John Maynard Keynes, in 2008. (Weidenfeld, 2008, ISBN 0297849085).

== See also ==
- Keynes family
- List of Russian ballet dancers
