= The Tale of the Stone Flower (Prokofiev) =

Ballet by Sergei Prokofiev

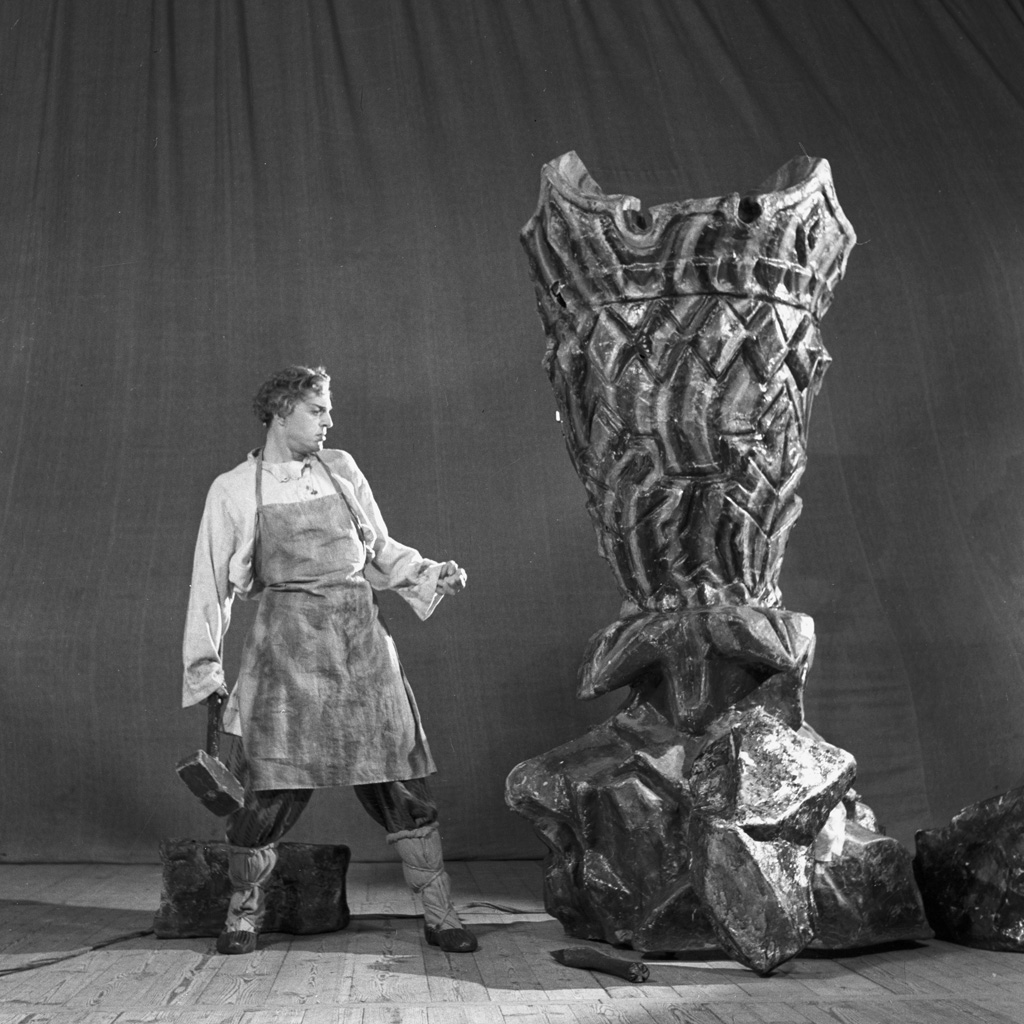
Vladimir Preobrazhensky in a scene from the ballet (1954)

The Tale of the Stone Flower, Op. 118 (Russian: Сказ о каменном цветке), is Sergei Prokofiev's eighth and last ballet, written between 1948 and 1953. It is based on the Russian Ural folk tale The Stone Flower by Pavel Bazhov and is also the last of the trilogy of ballets Prokofiev wrote in the Russian ballet tradition. It was premiered posthumously in 1954, conducted by Yuri Fayer.

== Numbers ==
Prologue

1 The Mistress of the Copper Mountain
2 Danila and his work

Act I
Scene 1

3 Danila in search of the flower
4 Danila meets some fellow villagers
5 Scene and Duet of Katerina and Danila
6 Interlude

Scene 2

7 Round Dance
8 Katerina dances with her friends
9 The Peasant Girls' Dance
10 Danila's and Katerina's Dance
11 The unmarried men's dance
12 Severyan's Dance
13 Altercation over the malachite vase
14 Scene of Katerina and Danila
15 Danila's Meditation

Scene 3

16 Danila enticed away by the Mistress of the Copper Mountain

Act II
Scene 4

17 The Mistress shows Danila the treasures of the earth
18 Duet of the Mistress and Danila
19 Scene and Waltz of the Diamonds
20 Dance of the Russian precious stones
21 Waltz
22 Danila's Monologue and the Mistress' Reply
23 The Mistress shows Danila the stone flower
24 Severyan and the Workers; The Mistress' Warning

Scene 5

25 Scene and Katerina's Dance
26 Severyan's Arrival
27 "Where are you, sweet Danila?"
28 The Appearance of the Mistress; Katerina's Joy

Scene 6

29 Ural Rhapsody
30 Interlude
31 Russian Dance

Scene 7

32 Gypsy Dance
33 Severyan's Dance
34 Solo of the Gypsy Girl and Coda
35 Katerina's Appearance and Severyan's Rage
36 The Appearance of the Mistress and Scene of Severyan transfixed to the earth
37 Severyan follows the Mistress
38 Severyan dies

Scene 8

39 Katerina sits by the fire and yearns for Danila
40 Scene and Dance of Katerina and the skipping of the Fire Spirits
41 Katerina follows the Fire Spirits
42 Dialogue of Katerina and the Mistress
43 Danila turned to stone
44 The Joy of the reuniting of Katerina and Danila
45 The Mistress presents gifts to Katerina and Danila
46 Epilogue

== Instrumentation ==
The work is scored for an orchestra consisting of 2 flutes (2nd doubling piccolo), 2 oboes (2nd doubling cor anglais), 2 clarinets (1st doubling E♭ clarinet, 2nd doubling bass clarinet), 2 bassoons (2nd doubling contrabassoon), 4 french horns, 3 trumpets, 3 trombones, tuba, timpani, percussion (triangle, castanets, wood blocks, tambourine, snare drum, cymbals, bass drum, tam-tam, tubular bells, xylophone), harp, piano, and strings.

== Premiere ==
12 February 1954, Bolshoi Theater, Moscow, conducted by Yuri Fayer. Choreography by Yuri Grigorovich. Dancers included Marina Kondratyeva, Марина Викторовна}} (one of the title roles), Raisa Struchkova (Yekaterina), Galina Ulanova (Yekaterina's sister), Aleksey Yermolayev (Severyan), Maya Plisetskaya (Icy Rusalka of the Copper Mountain), Vladimir Preobrazhensky (Danila's brother), Gennadi Lediakh (one of the good bailiffs), and Yuri Grigoriev (Danila) and more.

== Recordings ==
Orchestra	Conductor	Record Company	Year of Recording	Format
Radio Philharmonie Hannover des NDR	Michail Jurowski	CPO	1995/7	CD
BBC Philharmonic Orchestra	Gianandrea Noseda	Chandos Records	2003	CD
Bolshoi Theater Orchestra	Gennady Rozhdestvensky	Melodiya	1968	CD/LP

== Orchestral suites from The Tale of the Stone Flower ==
As usual, Prokofiev extracted music from the ballet for concert performance.

=== Wedding Suite, Op. 126 (1951) ===
Available recordings:

Orchestra	Conductor	Record Company	Year of Recording	Format
Royal Scottish National Orchestra	Neeme Järvi	Chandos Records	1989	CD
Novosibirsk Philharmonic Orchestra	Arnold Katz	Russian Season	1997	CD
Lahti Symphony Orchestra	Dima Slobodeniouk	BIS	2020	CD
USSR Radio/TV Large Symphony Orchestra	Gennady Rozhdestvensky	Melodiya		LP

=== Gypsy Fantasy, Op. 127 (1951) ===
Available recordings:

Orchestra	Conductor	Record Company	Year of Recording	Format
Lahti Symphony Orchestra	Dima Slobodeniouk	BIS	2020	CD
Moscow Radio/TV Symphony Orchestra	Gennady Rozhdestvensky	Melodiya		LP

=== Urals Rhapsody, Op. 128 (1951) ===
There are no available recordings.

=== The Mistress of the Copper Mountain, Op. 129 ===
Available recordings:

Orchestra	Conductor	Record Company	Year of Recording	Format
Lahti Symphony Orchestra	Dima Slobodeniouk	BIS	2020	CD

== See also ==
- List of ballets by title
