= Susan Sellers =

British author, editor and novelist

- Citizenship: British
- Education: University of London; Paris-Sorbonne University
- Known for: Novels; criticism
- Awards: Arts and Humanities Research Council Award; Leverhulme Research Fellowship; Canongate Prize
- Scientific career
- Fields: Literature in English; Creative Writing
- Workplaces: University of St Andrews

Susan Sellers is a British author, translator, editor and novelist. She was the first woman to be made a professor in the field of English literature as well as creative writing at the University of St Andrews, and is co-General Editor of the Cambridge University Press edition of the writings of Virginia Woolf.

Sellers' first novel, Vanessa and Virginia, is a fictionalised account of the life of Vanessa Bell and of her complex relationship with her sister Virginia Woolf. Sellers' second novel, Given the Choice, is set in the contemporary art and music worlds. Her most recent novel Firebird is about the Russian dancer Lydia Lopokova, her love affair and marriage to British economist John Maynard Keynes, and her relationship with the Bloomsbury Group.

== Life ==
Sellers gained her PhD from the University of London in 1992, having previously received a Diplôme d'Etudes Approfondies from Paris-Sorbonne University. While in Paris, Sellers became involved with leading French feminist writers, and has written on their work, for example, Language and Sexual Difference (Macmillan, 1995). She has worked closely with Hélène Cixous, and has been influential in introducing her work to the English-speaking world, in books such as The Hélène Cixous Reader (Routledge, 1994), Hélène Cixous: Authorship, Autobiography and Love (Polity and Blackwell, 1996), Hélène Cixous: Live Theory (Continuum, 2004), and in translations such as Three Steps on the Ladder of Writing (Columbia University Press, 1993) and Coming to Writing and Other Essays (Harvard University Press, 1991).

Sellers' work has been oriented towards women's writing. Myth and Fairy Tale in Contemporary Women's Fiction (Palgrave, 2001) is an investigation into the ongoing resonance of myth and fairy tale for contemporary women's fiction, drawing on material by Sigmund Freud, Carl Jung, Bruno Bettelheim, Roland Barthes, Jack Zipes and Marina Warner, as well as French feminists Hélène Cixous, Luce Irigaray and Julia Kristeva, to read works by such writers as A. S. Byatt, Angela Carter, Anne Rice, Michèle Roberts, Emma Tennant and Fay Weldon. Sellers has also written on and edited a number of collections concerned with feminist theory and criticism, including A History of Feminist Literary Criticism (with Gill Plain, Cambridge University Press, 2007) and Feminist Criticism: Theory and Practice (Harvester Wheatsheaf, 1991).

Sellers' interest in the writings of Virginia Woolf has led to her involvement in the Cambridge University Press edition of Woolf's writings which received a major Arts and Humanities Research Council Award in 2005 to support post-doctoral researchers. The edition aims for transparency in its mapping of the variants between the first British edition of Woolf's texts and those she subsequently oversaw – in particular the first American publication. It also aims to provide full annotation to Woolf's densely allusive prose. In addition to co-directing the project, Sellers also co-edited Virginia Woolf's The Waves (with Michael Herbert) and co-wrote the 'Introduction' to Jacob's Room with Stuart N. Clarke. With Sue Roe, Sellers co-edited and contributed to The Cambridge Companion to Virginia Woolf (Cambridge University Press, 2000). Sellers edited the second edition of The Cambridge Companion to Virginia Woolf in 2010. Sellers' novel, Vanessa and Virginia, is in part a fictional biography of Virginia Woolf. It has been translated into 16 languages, including Chinese, Japanese and Persian, and was adapted for the stage by Elizabeth Wright and directed by Emma Gersch in 2009. The play premiered in Aix-en-Provence in 2010.

Throughout, Sellers has been particularly interested in the creative process of writing. This is reflected in three collections published by The Women's Press – Delighting the Heart: A Notebook by Women Writers (1988), Taking Reality by Surprise (1991), and Instead of Full Stops (1996) – as well as in the translated selections from The Writing Notebooks of Hélène Cixous ( Continuum, 2004). For this latter project, Sellers was awarded a Leverhulme Research Fellowship in 2001–2002, which she held as a Visiting Fellow of Trinity College, Cambridge.

Sellers now combines academic research with work as a novelist. In 2012 she was elected a senior member of St Catharine's College, Cambridge and in 2020 of Robinson College, Cambridge.

== Works ==
- Firebird: a Bloomsbury love story (novel), EER (2022) ISBN 9781913087807
- Given the Choice (novel), Cillian Press (2013)
- Virginia Woolf's The Waves, (ed. with Michael Herbert) Cambridge University Press (2010)
- The Cambridge Companion to Virginia Woolf, revised second edition, (ed.) Cambridge University Press (2010)
- White Ink: Interviews on Sex, Text and Politics with Hélène Cixous, (ed. and transl.) Acumen and Columbia (2008)
- Vanessa and Virginia (novel), Two Ravens Press, Houghton Mifflin Harcourt and Mariner Books U.S. (2008)
- A History of Feminist Literary Criticism, (ed. with Gill Plain) Cambridge University Press (2007)
- Hélène Cixous, La Chambre de Vera, (transl.) Black Dog Publishing (2006)
- Live Theory, (with Ian Blyth) Continuum (2004)
- The Writing Notebooks of Hélène Cixous, (ed. and transl.) Continuum (2004)
- Myth and Fairy Tale in Contemporary Women's Fiction, Palgrave (2001)
- The Cambridge Companion to Virginia Woolf, (ed. with Sue Roe) Cambridge University Press (2000)
- Hélène Cixous: Authorship, Autobiography and Love, Polity and Blackwell (1996)
- Instead of Full Stops, (ed.) The Women's Press (1996)
- Language and Sexual Difference, Macmillan (1995)
- The Hélène Cixous Reader, (ed. and transl.) Routledge (1994)
- The Semi-Transparent Envelope: Feminism and Fiction, (with Nicole Ward Jouve and Sue Roe) Marion Boyars (1994)
- Héléne Cixous, Three Steps on the Ladder of Writing, (transl. with Sarah Cornell) Columbia University Press (1993)
- Feminist Criticism: Theory and Practice, (ed.) Harvester Wheatsheaf (1991)
- Taking Reality by Surprise, (ed.) The Women's Press (1991)
- Héléne Cixous, Coming to Writing and Other Essays, (transl. with Sarah Cornell, Deborah Jenson and Ann Liddle) Harvard University Press, 1991
- Delighting the Heart: A Notebook by Women Writers, (ed.) The Women's Press (1988)
- Writing Differences: Readings from the Seminar of Héléne Cixous, (ed.) Open University Press and St Martin's Press (1988)
