= Fyodor Lopukhov =

Soviet and Russian ballet dancer and choreographer

- Born: Fyodor Vasilyevich Lopukhov; October 20, 1886; Saint Petersburg, Russian Empire
- Died: January 28, 1973 (aged 86); Leningrad, Soviet Union
- Occupations: Ballet dancer, choreographer
- Years active: 1905–1960

Fyodor Vasilyevich Lopukhov (Russian: Фёдор Васильевич Лопухов; 20 October 1886, Saint Petersburg – 28 January 1973, Leningrad) was a Soviet and Russian ballet dancer and choreographer. People's Artist of the RSFSR (1956).

== Training and dance career ==
Lopukhov was born into a family of dancers, which included his brother, Andrei, and his two sisters, Evgenia and the renowned Lydia Lopokova. Lydia was a dancer for Sergei Diaghilev and married John Maynard Keynes. Lopukhov graduated from the Saint Petersburg Theatre School in 1905 and began his career at the Mariinsky Theatre. He also toured with the Bolshoi in their 1910–11 season.

== Choreography ==
Following the Revolution of 1917, a period of experimentation in ballet ensued as a distaste for works which evoked the imperial court developed in post-revolutionary Russia. To re-appeal to the public, choreographers in Soviet Russia explored new performance spaces and formed smaller chamber ballet companies where there would be more scope for creativity. Among those experimental choreographers was Fyodor Lopukhov.

Lopukhov considered the relationship between music and dance, suggesting that choreographers should be able to analyze the score of their ballet as to better portray the nuances of the score in terms of instrumentation, rhythm, color, and dynamics. His goal was to create ballets from a musical as opposed to a dramatic perspective – he published his ideas in his book Paths of a Balletmaster in 1925.

Lopukhov was appointed the artistic director of the Leningrad State Theatre of Opera and Ballet (Kirov) in 1922 and quickly began to override the work done by Marius Petipa by creating plotless ballets – the first, and best known, being The Magnificence of the Universe (1923), a "dance symphony" done to Beethoven's fourth symphony. Unlike the Petipa classics, The Magnificence did not tell any story, but symbolically suggested the origin of universal light and other profound spiritual concepts. The choreography was characterized by a mixture of academic ballet technique and acrobatic lifts that would later become synonymous with The Soviet style of ballet – his cast included George Balanchine who would later introduce similar processes and concepts to the American dance scene. The Magnificence, after a positive rehearsal review by contemporaries, was received negatively on its debut and Lopukhov did not attempt any further dance symphonies.

Lopukhov also created the Soviet political ballet focusing on the concept of a cleansing whirlwind titled Red Whirlwind (1924). This ballet, the first to tackle the subject of the 1917 Revolution, begins with an act or “process” with strong, aggressive dancers opposing the passive and elusive group. The second “process” depicts dissatisfied citizens with robbers and drunks who are defeated by the working class.

Some other ballets choreographed by Lopukhov in an effort to find a new means of expression include Night on Bald Mountain, with music by Mussorgsky (1924), Pulcinella (1926) and The Fox (1927), both with music by Stravinsky. His attempts to evolve the principles of classical dance were displayed in the acrobatic movements and character dances closely resembling the original ethnic dances they sprung forth from. This was apparent in his ballet The Ice Maiden, with music by Grieg (1927), which was one of his longest running ballets, being staged until 1936. He also choreographed The Bolt in 1931 and choreographed and co-wrote the libretto for The Limpid Stream in 1935, both with music by Shostakovich. Following a negative editorial of The Limpid Stream in the Pravda in early February 1936, which resulted in Lopukhov's co-librettist Adrian Piotrovsky being sent to a gulag, Lopukhov was stripped of his directorship and his choreographic career was effectively ended.

Lopukhov assembled courses for choreographers from 1937-1941 at the Leningrad Choreographic School. He was artistic director of the choreographic section in the stage directing department at the Leningrad Conservatory starting in 1962.

Lopukhov’s other choreographed ballets include The Firebird (1921), Raymonda (1922), The Sleeping Beauty (1923), Don Quixote (1923), Khovanshchina (1926), The Red Poppy (1929), Coppélia (1934), The Snow Maiden (1947), and Pictures at an Exhibition (1963).
