= Natalia Osipova =

Russian ballerina (born 1986)

- Наталья Осипова
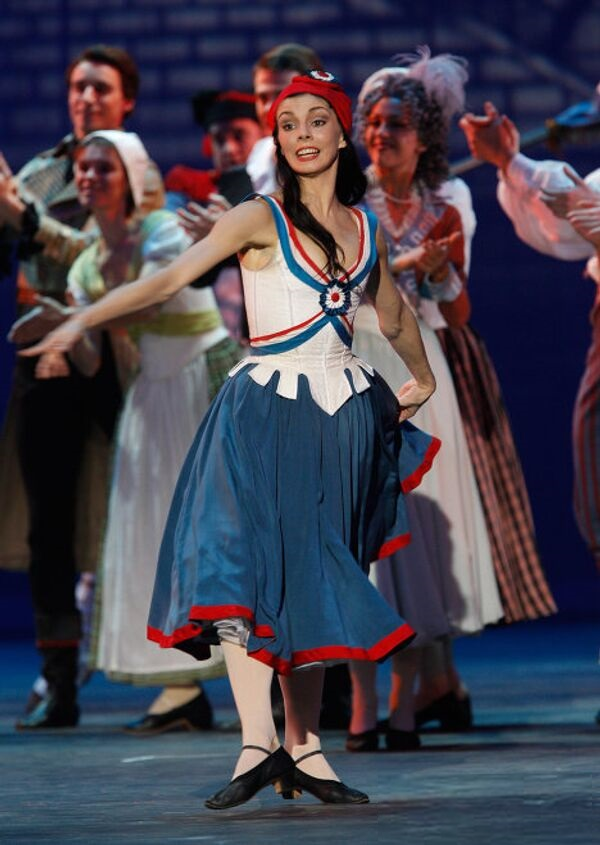
- Natalia Osipova in an extract from Flames of Paris, at the reopening gala of the Bolshoi Theatre 2011
- Born: Natalia Petrovna Osipova; 18 May 1986 (age 40); Moscow, Russian SFSR, Soviet Union
- Citizenship: Russia; United Kingdom (nat. 2022)
- Education: Moscow State Academy of Choreography (The Bolshoi Ballet Academy)
- Occupation: Ballet dancer
- Dancing career
- Current group: The Royal Ballet
- Former groups: Bolshoi Ballet, Mikhailovsky Theatre

Natalia Petrovna Osipova (Russian: Наталья Петровна Осипова; born 18 May 1986) is a Russian ballerina, currently a principal ballerina with The Royal Ballet in London.

== Early life and training ==
Born in Moscow, Osipova began formal ballet training at the age of nine at the Mikhail Lavrosky Ballet School. From 1996 to 2004, she studied at the Moscow State Academy of Choreography (The Bolshoi Ballet Academy), under the tutelage of Marina Kotova and Marina Leonova.

== Career ==
At the age of 18, she joined the Bolshoi Ballet as a member of the corps de ballet. In 2005, she danced the role of Kitri in Alexei Fadeyechev's production of Don Quixote to critical acclaim and was promoted to soloist in 2006. She was named one of the 25 to Watch by Dance Magazine in 2007 and became a leading soloist in 2009. In 2010, she became a principal dancer at the Bolshoi Ballet, but resigned in 2011, citing "artistic freedom" as her reason for leaving.

After leaving the Bolshoi, she joined American Ballet Theatre as a guest dancer for their Metropolitan Opera House season. She danced Don Quixote with José Manuel Carreño, and both The Sleeping Beauty and Romeo and Juliet with David Hallberg. A week before her performance in The Sleeping Beauty, she was robbed outside the Met, but suffered only minor bruises and was able to perform. She lost only a pair of pointe shoes and a small hammer used to shape them. In December 2011, she joined the Mikhailovsky Ballet.

In 2011, Osipova performed in Roy Assaf's Six Years Later, partnering with Jason Kittelberger and the same year danced in Valse Triste by Alexei Ratmansky. The season then continued with her appearances in various solo performances, including in Ludwig van Beethoven's Moonlight Sonata and Yuka Oishi's Ave Maria.

On 8 April 2013, it was announced that Osipova would join The Royal Ballet as a principal dancer, having previously danced as a guest artist in Swan Lake. She cited the broader and more diverse repertoire as her primary motivation for the move. She debuted on 21 November 2013, in Romeo and Juliet, partnered by Carlos Acosta. She has also danced in The Nutcracker and Giselle, with Acosta and Federico Bonelli.

In 2016, she performed the role of Grand Duchess Anastasia Nikolaevna of Russia/Anna Anderson in Anastasia.

In 2018, Osipova appeared with David Hallberg in Pure Dance, a refined ballet of Antony Tudor's The Leaves Are Fading from 1975.

In 2019, Osipova played the role of a mother in The Mother of Arthur Pita and in June 2019 she appeared in Gerald Fox's documentary film Force of Nature. Osipova also performed with David Hallberg, dancing Giselle at Lincoln Center in New York.

Osipova played a supporting role in the 2023 biopic drama Joika about the American ballerina Joy Womack. In September 2026, she made her acting debut playing the role of ballerina Lydia Lopokova in James Graham's play The Standard of Living at the Theatre Royal Haymarket.

== Repertoire ==
Osipova's debut as Kitri in Don Quixote on 7 November 2005 launched her solo career.

- Don Quixote: Kitri, 1st variation in Grand Pas, dryad/Four Dryads
- Swan Lake: Odette/Odile, The Spanish Bride
- La Bayadère: Nikiya, Gamzatti, 2nd variation (Trio of Shades)
- Giselle: Giselle, Peasant Pas de Deux
- La Sylphide: The Sylph, Nancy
- Romeo and Juliet: Juliet
- Coppélia: Swanhilda
- Esmeralda: Esmeralda
- Flames of Paris: Jeanne
- Carmen Suite: Carmen
- The Sleeping Beauty: Princess Aurora, Cinderella
- Laurencia: Laurencia
- Le Corsaire: Medora, 3rd variation (Trio of Odalisques)
- Manon: Manon
- Lost Illusions: Coralie
- Notre Dame de Paris: Esmeralda
- La Fille Mal Gardée: Lise
- Jewels: Rubies Soloist
- The Pharaoh's Daughter: Aspicia, Ramze
- The Nutcracker: Sugar Plum Fairy, Clara, Spanish Doll
- Onegin: Tatiana
- Marguerite and Armand: Marguerite
- Mayerling: Mary Vetsera
- A Midsummer Night's Dream: Mustardseed
- The Dream: Titania
- Bolt: Manka Fart, Typist/Typists
- The Firebird: Firebird
- Petrushka: Ballerina
- The Bright Stream: Ballerina
- Sylvia: Sylvia
- Spartacus: Aegina
- Anastasia: Anastasia, Anna Anderson
- The Legend of Love: Mekhmeneh Bahnu
- Cinderella: Cinderella, Waltz Soloist/Soloists, Autumn
- A Month in the Country: Natalia Petrovna
- Isadora: Isadora
- The Taming of the Shrew: Katerina
- Rhapsody: Soloist
- Tchaikovsky Pas de Deux: Soloist
- Raymonda Grand Pas de Deux: Soloist
- Russian Seasons: Couple in Red
- Gaîté Parisienne: Cancan Soloist
- Serenade: Soloist
- Middle Duet: Soloist
- Paquita Grand Pas de Deux: Soloist
- Jeu de cards: Soloist
- Symphony in C: Part 3 Soloist
- Class Concert
- Remansos
- Cinque
- In the Upper Room: Soloist
- Connectome
- Tetractys - The Art of the Fugue
- The Wind: Dancer
- Solo for Two
- Passacaille
- Woolf Works
- Icarus
- Strapless: Amélie Gautreau
- Les Presages: Frivolity

== Personal life ==
Osipova moved to London in 2013 and became a naturalised British citizen in 2022. She formerly had relationships with dancers Ivan Vasiliev, to whom she was engaged, and Sergei Polunin. Osipova is engaged to American dancer Jason Kittelberger. They reside in North London together with their four dogs.

She contracted COVID-19 twice: in December 2021 and March 2022.

== Awards ==
- Grand Prix at Prix de Luxembourg International Ballet Competition (2003)
- 3rd Prize at Moscow International Ballet Competition (2005)
- Ballet Magazine Soul of Dance Prize in the category Rising Star (2007)
- Leonide Massine Award in the category of Significance of Talent (2008)
- The International Dance Association Prix Benois de la Danse Award for performances in La Sylphide, Giselle, Le Corsaire and The Flames of Paris (2008)
- Richard Sherrington Award (2008)
- The Golden Mask award for performances in Twyla Tharp's In The Upper Room (2008) and La Sylphide (2009)
- Special Prize of The Golden Mask jury for Best Duet in La Sylphide (2009)
- UK National Dance Awards presented by The Critics' Circle: Best Female Dancer (2007, 2010 and 2014)

== See also ==
- List of Russian ballet dancers
- List of prima ballerinas
