= Arang Rhie =

South Korean bioinformatician

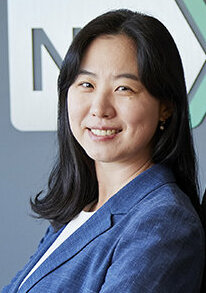
- Rhie in 2023
- Education: Ewha Womans University; Seoul National University
- Scientific career
- Fields: Genome informatics
- Workplaces: National Human Genome Research Institute

Arang Rhie (Korean: 이아랑) is a South Korean bioinformatician serving as a staff scientist in the genome informatics section at the National Human Genome Research Institute.

Rhie earned a B.S. in computer science (2009) and a M.S. in bioinformatics (2011) from the Ewha Womans University. She graduated with a Ph.D. at the Seoul National University College of Medicine in 2017. She conducted postdoctoral research at the National Human Genome Research Institute (NHGRI).

Rhie is a staff scientist in NHGRI genome informatics section. In 2023, the Partnership for Public Service has named, Rhie, Adam M. Phillippy, and Sergey Koren, all members of the National Human Genome Research Institute-funded Telomere-to-Telomere (T2T) Consortium, as finalists for the Samuel J. Heyman Service to America Medals.
