= Henry Litolff =

French and British pianist, composer, and music publisher (1818–1891)

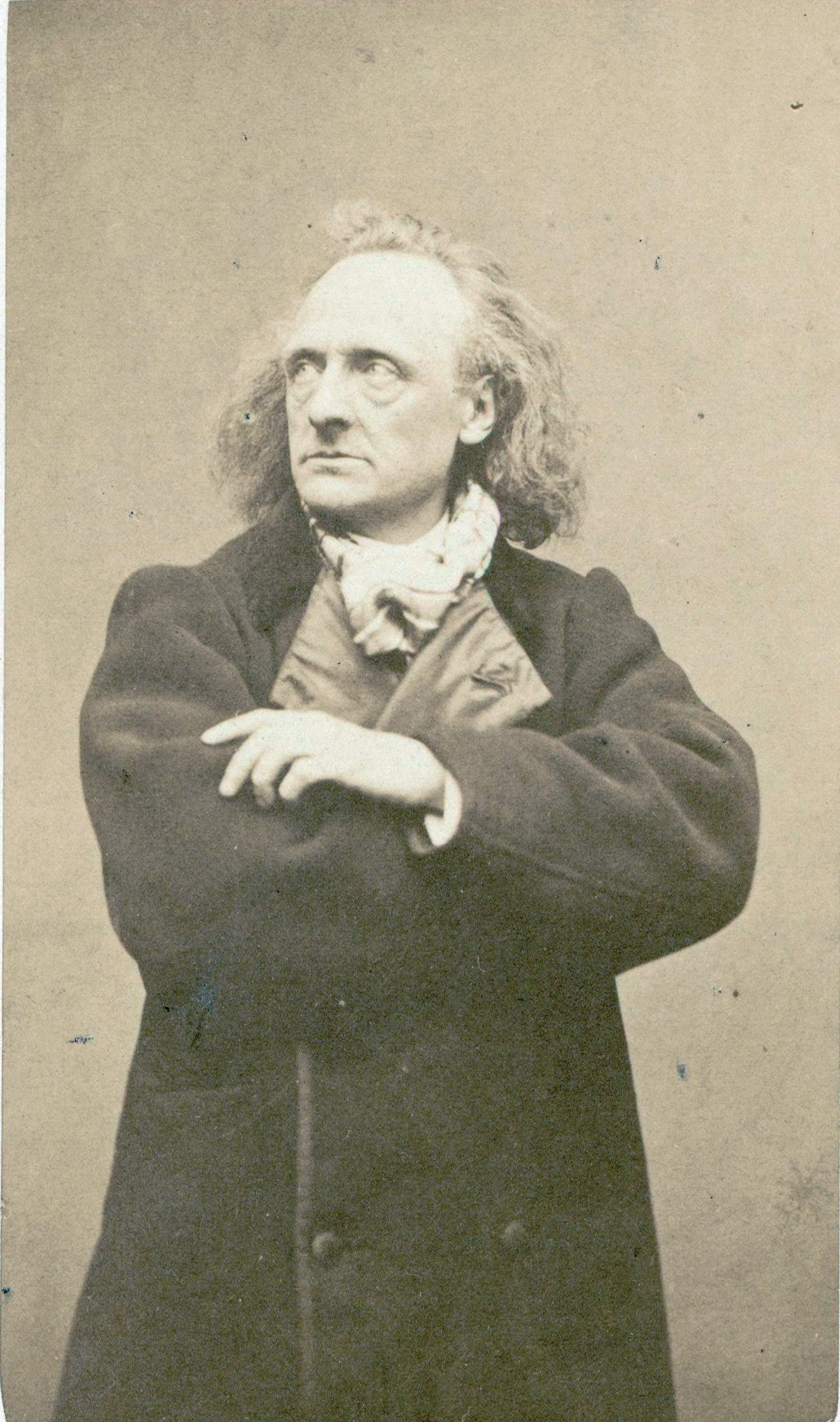
- Litolff in 1864, by Étienne Carjat
- Born: 6 February 1818; London
- Died: 5 August 1891 (aged 73); Bois-Colombes
- Occupations: Pianist; Composer; Music Publisher
- Spouses: Elisabeth Etherington; Julie Meyer; Louise de Larochefoucauld

Henry Charles Litolff (6 February 1818 – 5 August 1891) was a French and British virtuoso pianist, composer of Romantic music, and music publisher born in London. A prolific composer, he is today known mainly for a single brief work – the scherzo from his Concerto Symphonique No. 4 in D minor – and remembered as the founder of the Collection Litolff (today part of Edition Peters), a highly regarded publishing imprint of classical music scores.

== Biography ==
Litolff was born in London in 1818 to a Scottish mother, Sophie (née Hayes), and a father, Martin Louis Litolff, from Alsace. The father, a violinist, had been previously taken prisoner of war while serving as a band musician in the Napoleonic army during the Peninsular War.

His father taught the boy Henry the rudiments of music, and in 1830, when he was twelve, he played for the renowned virtuoso pianist Ignaz Moscheles, who was so impressed that he gave him free lessons starting that same year. Litolff began to concertize when he was fourteen. His lessons with Moscheles continued until in 1835, at the age of 17, Litolff abruptly married 16-year-old Elisabeth Etherington. The couple moved to Melun, and then to Paris.

He separated from Elisabeth in 1839 and moved to Brussels. Around 1841, Litolff moved to Warsaw, where he is believed to have conducted the Teatr Narodowy (National Theatre) orchestra. In 1844 he travelled to Germany, gave concerts, and taught the future pianist-conductor Hans von Bülow.

The following year, Litolff returned to England with the idea of finally divorcing Elisabeth; but the plan backfired and he ended up not only heavily fined but imprisoned. He managed to escape and flee to the Netherlands – the escape said to have been accomplished with the assistance of the jailer's daughter.

Litolff became friends with the music publisher Gottfried Meyer of Braunschweig (English: Brunswick), Germany; and, after Meyer's death, he married the widow Julie in 1851 (having finally been granted a divorce from Elisabeth as a new citizen of Brunswick). Whilst married to Julie, the publishing firm G. M. Meyer (which she had been running successfully, and which was to become Litolff) grew substantially. This second marriage lasted until 1858, when he divorced her and once again moved to Paris. After the divorce, the publishing firm was run by Litolff's adoptive son, Theodor Litolff (1839–1912). In Paris he found a third wife, Louise de La Rochefoucauld; and, upon her death in 1873, a fourth (who had previously nursed him through an illness). Litolff died at Bois-Colombes, near Paris, in 1891, just short of his seventy-third birthday.

== Works ==
His most notable works were the five concertos symphoniques, essentially symphonies with piano obbligato. The first one, in D minor, is lost; the others (not in the concert repertoire, but available in modern recordings) are:

- Concerto Symphonique No. 2 in B minor, Op. 22 (1844)
- Concerto Symphonique No. 3 in E-flat major, Op. 45 (c. 1846)
- Concerto Symphonique No. 4 in D minor, Op. 102 (c. 1852)
- Concerto Symphonique No. 5 in C minor, Op. 123 (c. 1867)

The only one of Litolff's compositions still performed at all regularly is the somewhat Mendelssohnian scherzo from the Fourth Concerto Symphonique, although his music was admired by Franz Liszt and he was the dedicatee of Liszt's own First Piano Concerto. Peter Donohoe recorded four of the concertos symphoniques for Hyperion. Tingyue Jiang began recording some of his solo piano music in 2023.

Litolff's Drame symphonique No. 1 Maximilien Robespierre, Op. 55, was one of the works conducted on Christmas Eve 1925 by Yuri Fayer at the Bolshoi Theatre in Moscow to accompany the world's first showing of Sergei Eisenstein's film Battleship Potemkin.

Henry Charles Litolff's tomb in Bois-Colombes
