= Sergey Koren =

U.S. bioinformatician

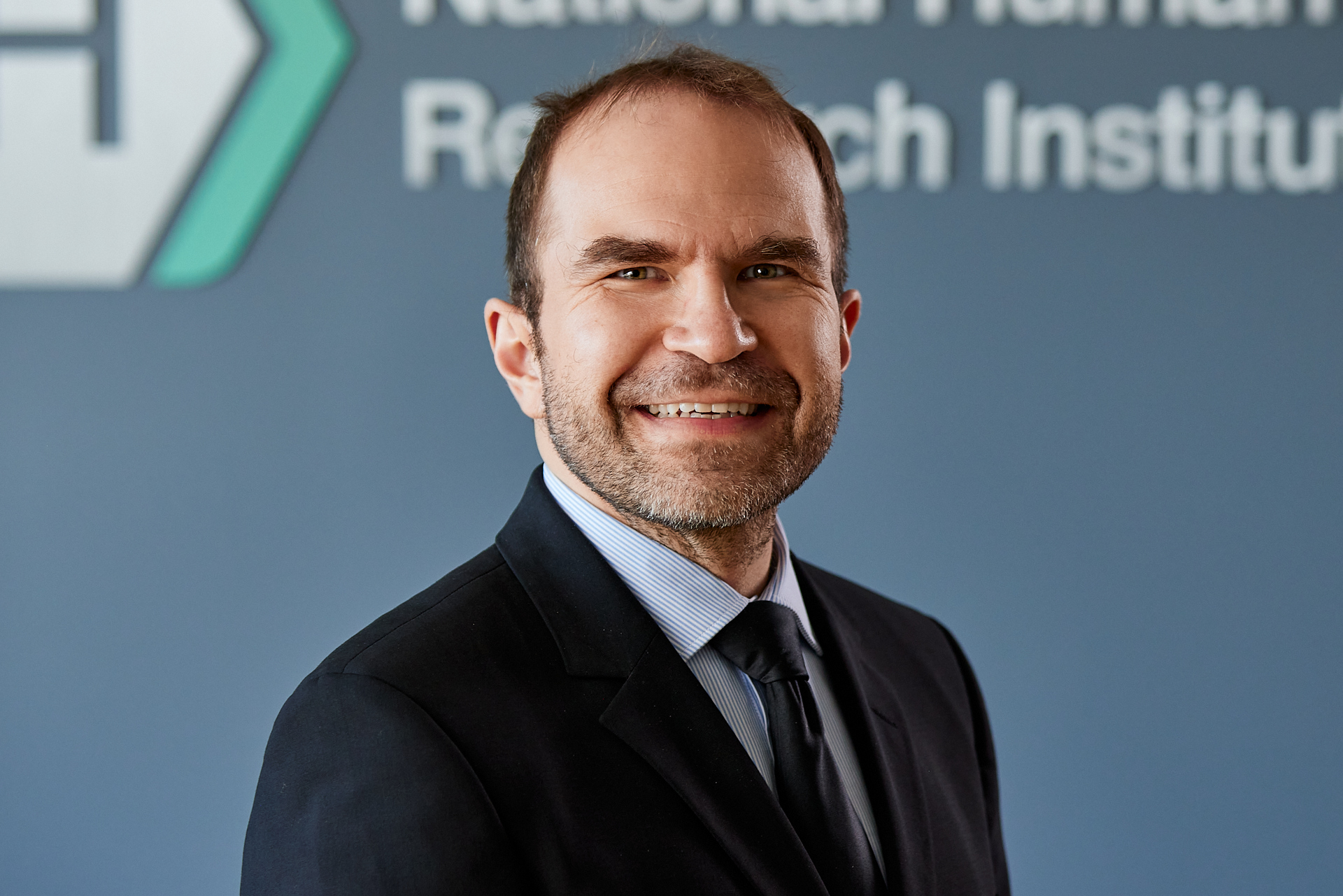
- Koren in 2023
- Education: University of Maryland, College Park
- Scientific career
- Fields: Genome informatics
- Workplaces: National Human Genome Research Institute

Sergey Koren is an American bioinformatician who is an associate investigator in the genome informatics section at the National Human Genome Research Institute.

After completing his M.S., Koren joined the J. Craig Venter Institute (JCVI) as a bioinformatics engineer under the supervision of Granger Sutton. During his three years at JCVI, he contributed to the development of the Celera Assembler, which has been used to assemble both the Drosophila melanogaster and human genomes. In parallel, Koren worked under the supervision Mihai Pop at the University of Maryland, College Park, where he developed several tools for metagenome assembly and analysis.

In 2010, Koren joined the National Biodefense Analysis and Countermeasures Center (NBACC) where he led genome assembly development and pioneered the use of single-molecule sequencing for the reconstruction of complete genomes. In 2015, Koren joined the National Human Genome Research Institute (NHGRI) as a founding member of the genome informatics section. He is an associate investigator in the Genome Informatics Section, Center for Genomics and Data Science at the National Human Genome Research Institute. In 2022, he was one of the lead authors on the publication reporting the first complete female human genome. In 2023, the Partnership for Public Service named, Koren, Arang Rhie, Adam M. Phillippy and the Telomere-to-Telomere (T2T) Consortium as finalists for the Samuel J. Heyman Service to America Medal in the field of Science, Technology and Environment for "conducting the first complete assembly of the human genome".
