= Nicole Ward Jouve =

French writer and literary critic (born 1938)

Nicole Ward Jouve (born 1938) is a French writer and literary critic, who writes in both French and English. For most of her career Ward Jouve lived and worked in England. She is emeritus professor of literature at the University of York.

Ward Jouve has been influenced by French literary critics such as Roland Barthes, Julia Kristeva, Luce Irigaray and Hélène Cixous. She writes in French, before translating herself into English.

== Works ==
- Spectre du Gris, 1977. Translated to English as Shades of Grey, London: Virago, 1981.
- Baudelaire: A Fire to Conquer Darkness. London: Macmillan, 1979.
- L'éntremise. Paris: Des femmes, 1980.
- Un homme nommé Zopolski. Paris: Des femmes, 1983.
- "The Street-cleaner": The Yorkshire Ripper Case on Trial. London: Boyars, 1986.
- Colette. Bloomington: Indiana University Press, 1987.
- White Woman Speaks with Forked Tongue: Criticism as Autobiography. London; New York : Routledge, 1991.
- (with Sue Roe, Susan Sellers, and Michèle Roberts) The Semi-Transparent Envelope: Women Writing, Feminism and Fiction. London: Boyars, 1994.
- The house where salmon perched. London: Rear Window, 1994.
- Female Genesis: Creativity, Self and Gender. Cambridge: Polity, 1997,
- Petits moments d'une femme qui rêvait d'être poète. Paris: Le préau des collines, 2005. With photographs by Jacques Le Sanff.
