= Vasily Tikhomirov =

Russian ballet dancer (1876–1956)

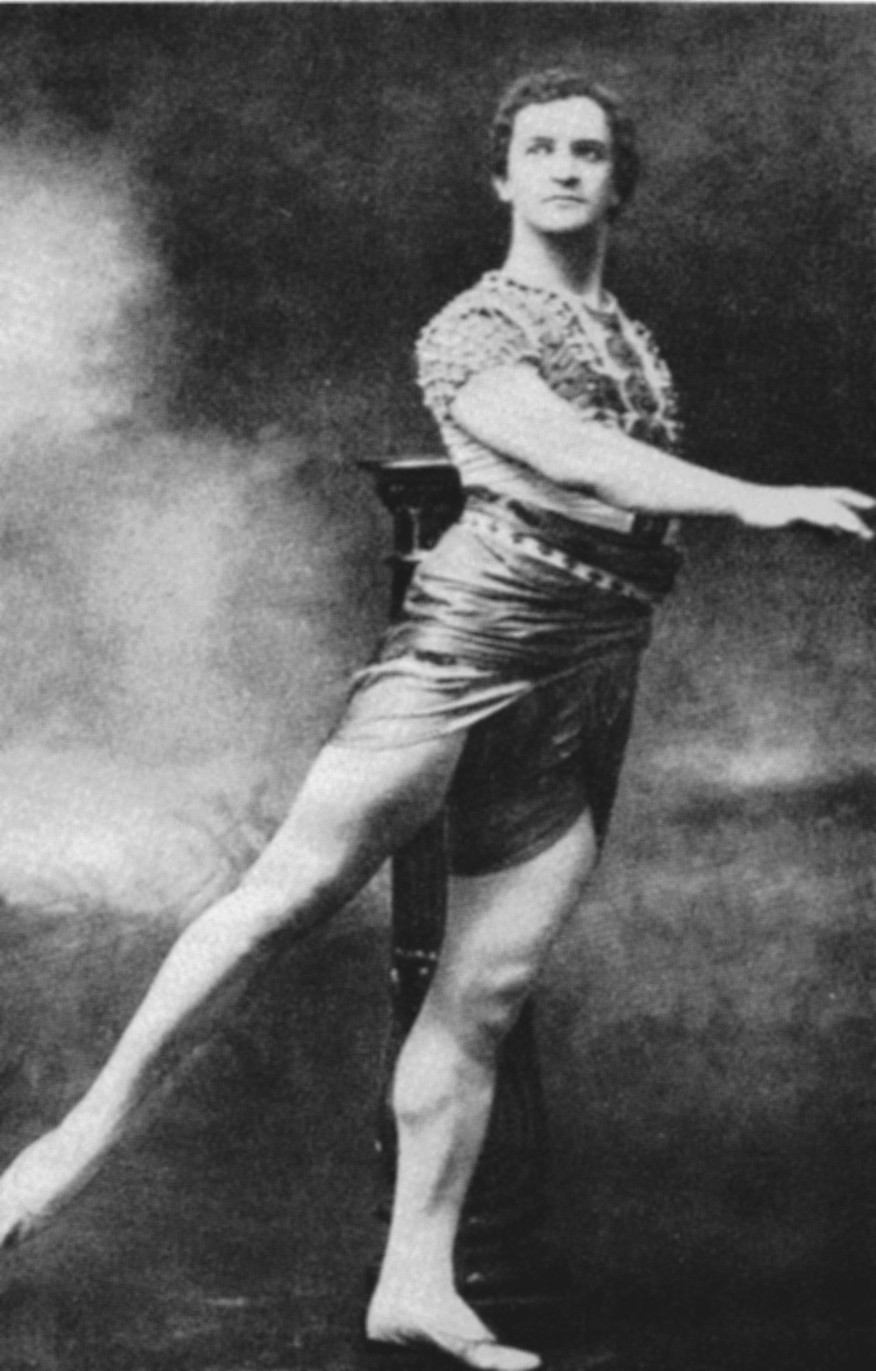
Vasiliy Tikhomirov as Taor in Alexander Gorsky's production of the Petipa/Pugni The Pharaoh's Daughter, Moscow, 1912

Vasiliy Dmitriyevich Tikhomirov (1876–1956) was a dancer (from 1895) and a choreographer (from 1913) with the Bolshoi Ballet of Moscow, Russia. His most distinguished production was The Red Poppy (1927), with his wife Yekaterina Geltzer in the main role. After the divorce Yekaterina Geltzer and Vasily Tikhomirov remained onstage partners.

He and Geltzer were buried in the Novodevichy Cemetery.

== See also ==
- List of Russian ballet dancers
