= The Red Poppy =

1927 Soviet ballet by Reinhold Glière

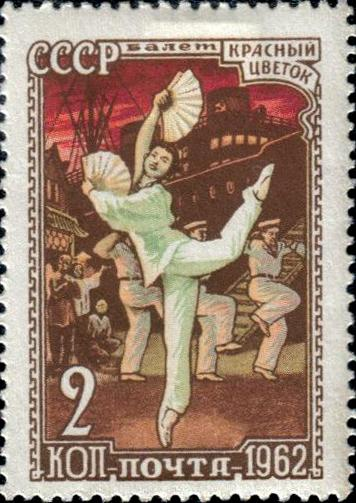
- Scene from The Red Poppy, a drawing on a Soviet postage stamp
- Native title: Красный мак
- Choreographer: (Acts 1 and 3): Lev Laschiline (Act 2): Vasily Tikhomirov
- Music: Reinhold Glière
- Premiere: 14 June 1927; Bolshoi Theatre, Moscow, Soviet Union
- Original ballet company: Bolshoi Ballet
- Characters: Taï-Choa; Soviet Captain; Li-Chan-Fou; Chinese Conjurer; Harbormaster of the Port; Ma Lichen (1949 staging); Nüwa (2010 staging)
- Design: Mikhail Kurilko
- Setting: 1920s-era Republican China

The Red Poppy (Russian: Красный мак, romanized: Krasniy mak) or sometimes The Red Flower (Russian: Красный цветок, romanized: Krasniy tsvetok) is a ballet in three acts and eight tableaux with an apotheosis, with a score written by Reinhold Glière and libretto by Mikhail Kurilko. This ballet was created in 1927 as the first Soviet ballet with a modern revolutionary theme. Possibly the most famous dance from this ballet is the Sailors Dance, sometimes referred to as the "Russian Sailors Dance" (although it is described as "Dance of the Sailors from the Soviet Ship" in the score and libretto). It is this musical selection for which Glière is perhaps best known. There have been four main versions of The Red Poppy.

== History ==
=== Original version (1927) ===
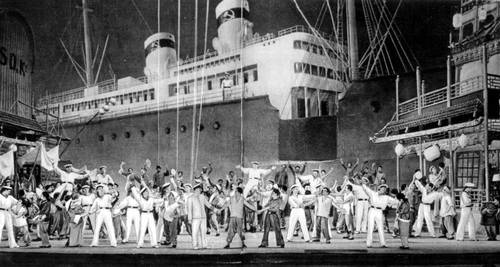
A scene from the 1927 production of The Red Poppy

The original version of The Red Poppy was choreographed by Lev Lashchiline (1st and 3rd Acts) and Vasily Tikhomirov (2nd Act). The first performance was on 14 June 1927 in the Bolshoi Theatre (which at the time under Soviet rule had been renamed "First People's State Theatre for Opera and Ballet"). The orchestra was led by Yuri Fayer. The ballet's 100th performance in Moscow occurred on 23 December 1928.

This production was staged in 1928 and 1930 in Sverdlovsk, and in 1928, 1949, and 1958 in Saratov. The Leningradsky Theatre of Opera and Ballet staged the ballet in 1929 in Leningrad, adding several dances to the production. The original version was performed in 1941 and 1950 in Gorky; in 1946 in Baku by the Azerbaijan State Academic Opera and Ballet Theatre; and in 1949 and 1958 by the Kirov Ballet.

In 1943, the Ballet Russe de Monte-Carlo staged a one-act version of the ballet in the Public Music Hall in Cleveland, Ohio. Premiering on October 9, 1943, the production was staged by Igor Schwezoff, with decor by Boris Aronson. Since World War II was being fought at the time, with the Soviets and Americans allied, the villain Li-Chan-Fou was changed to a Japanese bar owner. The group of Soviet sailors now included British and Americans as well.

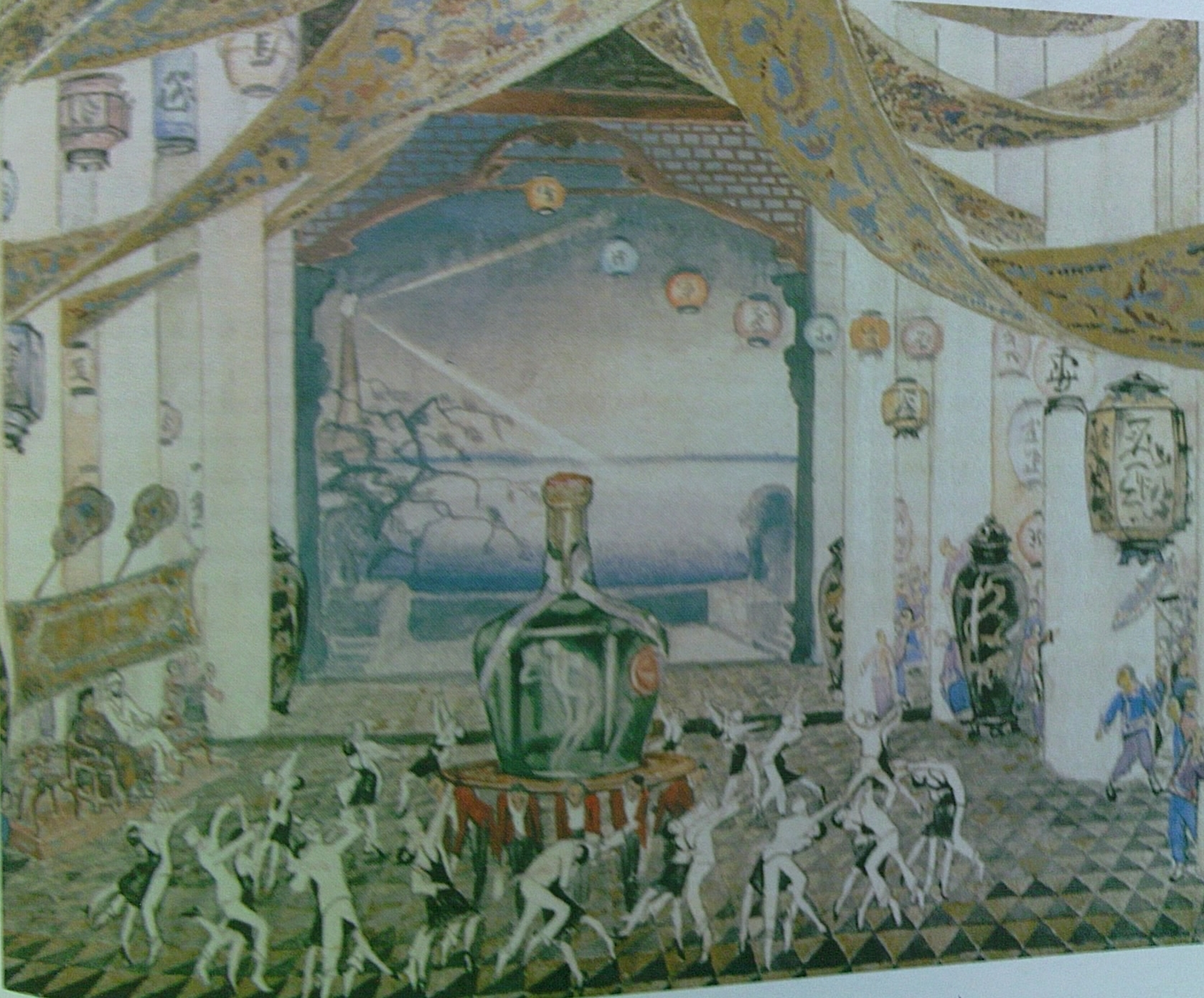
Scene of foxtrot dance, scenery by M. Kurilko

==== The Red Flower (1957) ====
In 1957, Vasily Tikhomirov and Mikhail Kurilko staged an expanded version of the ballet. Renamed The Red Flower (to avoid the association with opium), the number of scenes ("tableaux") was increased from 8 to 13. It was first performed on 24 November 1957 in the Bolshoi Theatre.

=== Lavrovsky version (1949) ===
In 1949 a new version of The Red Poppy was choreographed by Leonid Lavrovsky. The scenario was rewritten by Aleksey Yermolayev, and the ballet was first performed on 30 December 1949 in the Bolshoi Theatre. The 1949 version introduced a new character, Ma Lichen.

=== Androsov version (2010) ===
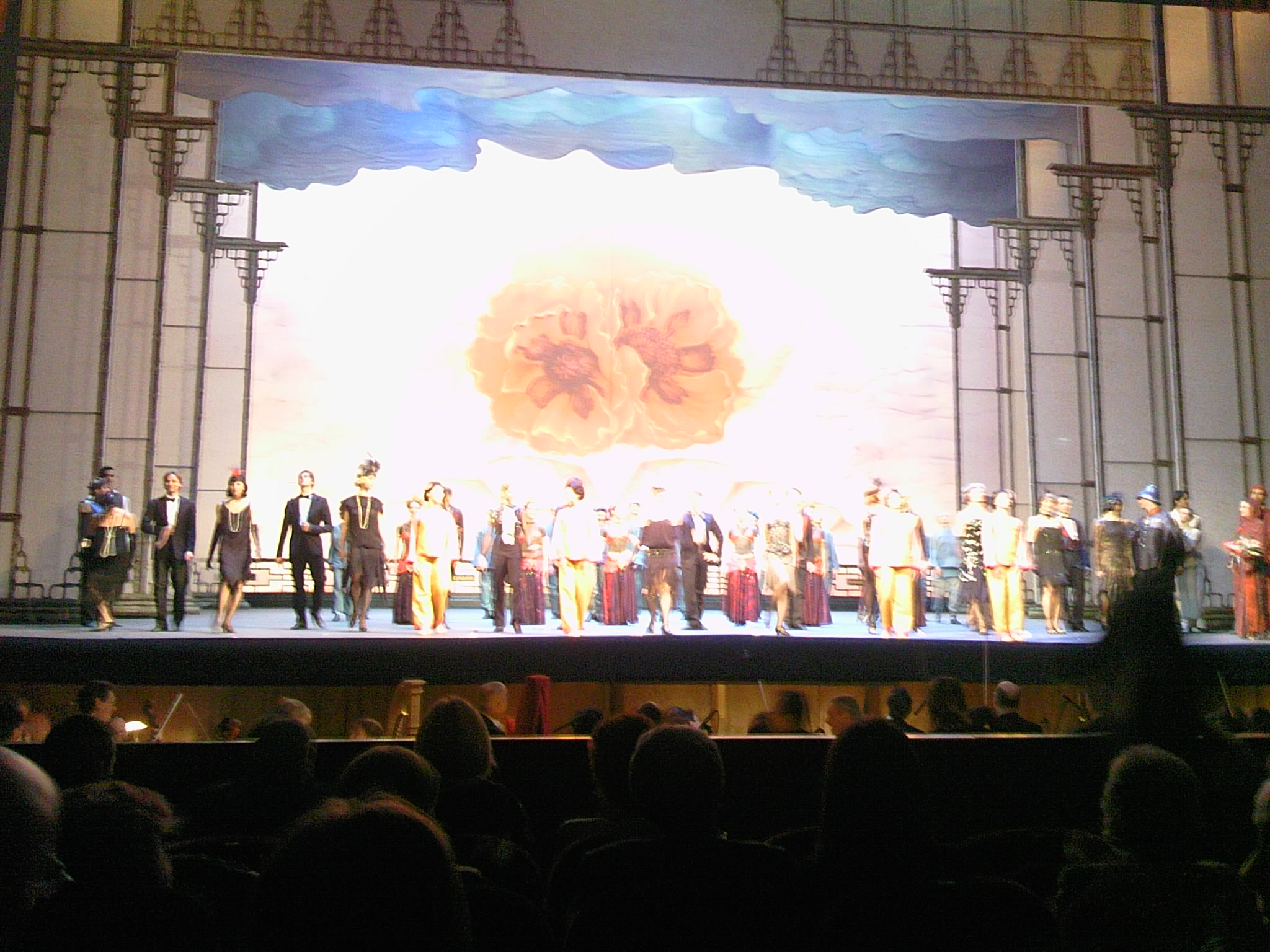
Ballet triumph in Rome, February 12, 2010

On 12 February 2010, a new production of The Red Poppy, with choreography by Nikolay Androsov, was performed at Teatro dell'Opera di Roma, ballet director Carla Fracci. Scenery and costumes by Elena Puliti, conductor Andrey Anikhanov, music by Reinhold Glière, musical cooperation by Francesco Sodini, stage director Beppe Menegatti. This version introduced a new character, Nüwa danced by Carla Fracci , the goddess of fertility. , .

A new production of this version is expected on June 13, 2015, at the Rostov State Opera and Ballet (Musical) Theatre, in Rostov-on-Don.

=== Vasiliev version (2010) ===
Also in 2010, a new production choreographed by Vladimir Vasiliev (who also did scenario editing and scenery), with costumes by Maria Vol'skaya, and music director and conducting by Anatoly Chepurnoy, was performed on 23 November at the Krasnoyarsk Ballet and Opera Theater.

=== Other performances ===
- 1949 in Perm
- 1950 and 1961 in Kuybyshev
- 1950 in Novosibirsk
- 1954 in Bratislava, Slovak National Theatre
- 1962 in Volgograd

== Synopsis ==
The ballet takes place at a seaport in 1920s-era Republican China. Ships carrying sailors from many lands, including the Soviet Union, are docked in a Chinese seaport. The Captain of the Soviet Ship notices a group of half-starved, overworked coolies being brutally driven to work even harder by their cruel harbormaster.

One night while dancing for the sailors aboard the ship, the beautiful Taï-Choa (Pinyin: Taohua) notices the Soviet Captain trying to rescue the poor Coolies from the Harbormaster. Impressed by the captain's act of kindness she gives him a red poppy as a symbol of her love.

When Taï-Choa's fiancé, the adventurer Li-Chan-Fou learns of this, he is jealous and orders her to kill the captain. She refuses and is later killed when a riot breaks out on the dock — thus sacrificing her life for the captain. As she dies, she gives another red poppy flower to a young Chinese girl as a sign of love and freedom.

== Structure ==
=== Act One ===
- First Tableau
- No. 1 Introduction
- No. 2 Unloading the Soviet Ship (Work of the Coolies)
- No. 3 Restaurant Scene
- No. 4 Dance of the Malaysian Women
- Scene and Exit of the Malaysian Women
- No. 5 Taï-Choa's Entrance
- No. 6 Fan Dance
- No. 7 Scene After Fan Dance
- No. 8 Dance in the Restaurant
- No. 9 Entrance of the Adventurer
- No. 10 Coolie's Work
- No. 11 Commotion in the Crowd. Arrival of the Captain of the Soviet Ship
- No. 12 Work of the Soviet Sailors
- No. 13 Scene of Taï-Choa with the Captain and the Adventurer
- No. 14 Dance of the Golden Thimbles
- No. 15 Exit of Taï-Choa
- No. 16 Victory Dance of the Coolies
- No. 17 Dance of Sailors from Different Nations
- No. 18 Dance of the Sailors from the Soviet Ship — Russian Song: Yablochko ("Little Apple")

=== Act Two ===
- Second Tableau
- No. 19 Introduction
- No. 20 Scene in the Opium Den
- No. 21 Dance of the Chinese Women
- No. 22 Exit of the Chinese Women
- No. 23 Conspiracy Scene
- No. 24 Taï-Choa's Anguish
- No. 25 Taï-Choa Smokes Opium
- Third Tableau
- No. 26 Taï-Choa's Dream and Visions
- No. 27 Adagio (Four Goddesses)
- No. 28 a) Cortege b) Sword Dance
- Fourth Tableau
- No. 29 Phoenix
- No. 30 Adagio of the Phoenix
- Fifth Tableau
- No. 31 Butterfly and Lotus Dance
- No. 32 Grand Adagio in E Major
- No. 33 Poppy Dance
- No. 34 Phoenix Variation
- No. 35 Taï-Choa's Variation (Xylophone Solo)
- No. 36 Dance of the Chinese Saltimbanque
- No. 37 Coda
- No. 38 The Red Barque

=== Act Three ===
- Sixth Tableau
- No. 39 Introduction
- No. 40 Charleston
- No. 41 Scene Before the Dance on the Dish
- No. 42 Dance on the Dish
- No. 43 Scene After the Dance on the Dish
- No. 44 Entrance of the Herald and the Saltimbanque. Mounting of the Chinese Theater.
- No. 45 Herald's Announcement
- No. 46 Demon's Dance
- No. 47 Herald's Announcement
- No. 48 Dance with Scarves
- No. 49 Herald's Announcement
- No. 50 Umbrella Dance
- No. 51 Herald's Announcement
- No. 52 Ribbon Dance
- No. 53 Dismounting of the Chinese Theater
- No. 54 Boston Waltz
- Seventh Tableau
- No. 55 Conspiracy Scene
- No. 56 Taï-Choa's Scene with the Captain
- Eighth Tableau
- No. 57 Boston Waltz (Reprise)
- No. 58 Chinese Tea
- No. 59 Chinese Dance with the Cups
- No. 60 Dance with the Goblet
- No. 61 Scene of Alarm
- No. 62 Ship's Departure
- No. 63 Passing of the Armed Coolies
- No. 64 Riot Scene
- No. 65 Taï-Choa's Death

=== Apotheosis ===
- No. 66 - Apotheosis

==== Dances Added for the 1929 Leningrad Production ====
- Variation in A Major
- Variation in B Major
- Variation of the Four Soloists
- Variation in G Major
- Eccentric Dance
- Chinese Generals (Children's Dance)
- Dance of the Little Drum
- Girls — American Dance
- Boston Waltz (Revised)

== Characters ==
- Harbormaster of the Port — L. A. Laschiline (1927) and Ivan Sidorov (1927), Alexei Bal'va (2010)
- Captain of the Soviet Ship — Alexeï D. Boulgakov and Mikhail Dudko (1927), Alexander Radunsky (1949 and 1957), Frederic Franklin (1943), Lukash Abrahamyan (2007), Igor Yebra (2010), Vito Mazzeo (2010), Vyacheslav Kapustin (2010)
- Taï-Choa, Comedian — Yekaterina Geltzer (1927), Viktorina Kriger (1927), Galina Ulanova (1949 and 1957), Olga Lepeshinskaya (1949), Alexandra Danilova (1943), Oksana Kucheruk (2010), Gaia Straccamore (2010), Anna Ol (2010)
- Li-Chan-Fou, Adventurer, Taï-Choa's Fiancé — Ivan Smoltsov (1927), Sergey Koren (1949 and 1957), Alexey Yermolayev (1949), Vito Mazzeo (2010), Manuel Paruccini (2010), Ivan Karnaukhov (2010), Farukh Ruzimatov (2015)
- Restaurant and Opium Den Patron — L. K. Matzkevitch (1927)
- Saltimbanque — V. A. Riabtzov (1927)
- First Overlord of the Coolies — A. V Orlov (1927)
- Chinese Conspirators — M. V. Orlov and I. F. Blokhine (1927)
- Herald of the Chinese Theater — Gherber (1927)
- Chinese Conjurer — Asaf Messerer (1927)
- Ma Lichen, introduced in the staging of 1949 — Yury Kondratov (1949 and 1957), Mikhail Gabovich (1949), Damiano Mongelli (2010)
- Nüwa, goddess of fertility, introduced in the staging of 2010 — Carla Fracci
