= Boris Asafyev =

Soviet Russian composer and musicologist

Boris Asafyev Борис Асафьев
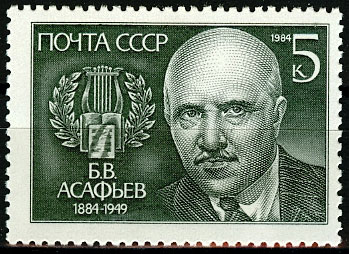
- Asafyev on a 1984 stamp

Background information
- Born: 29 July 1884; Saint Petersburg, Russian Empire
- Died: 27 January 1949 (aged 64) Moscow, Russian SFSR, Soviet Union
- Occupations: Composer, writer, musicologist, musical critic

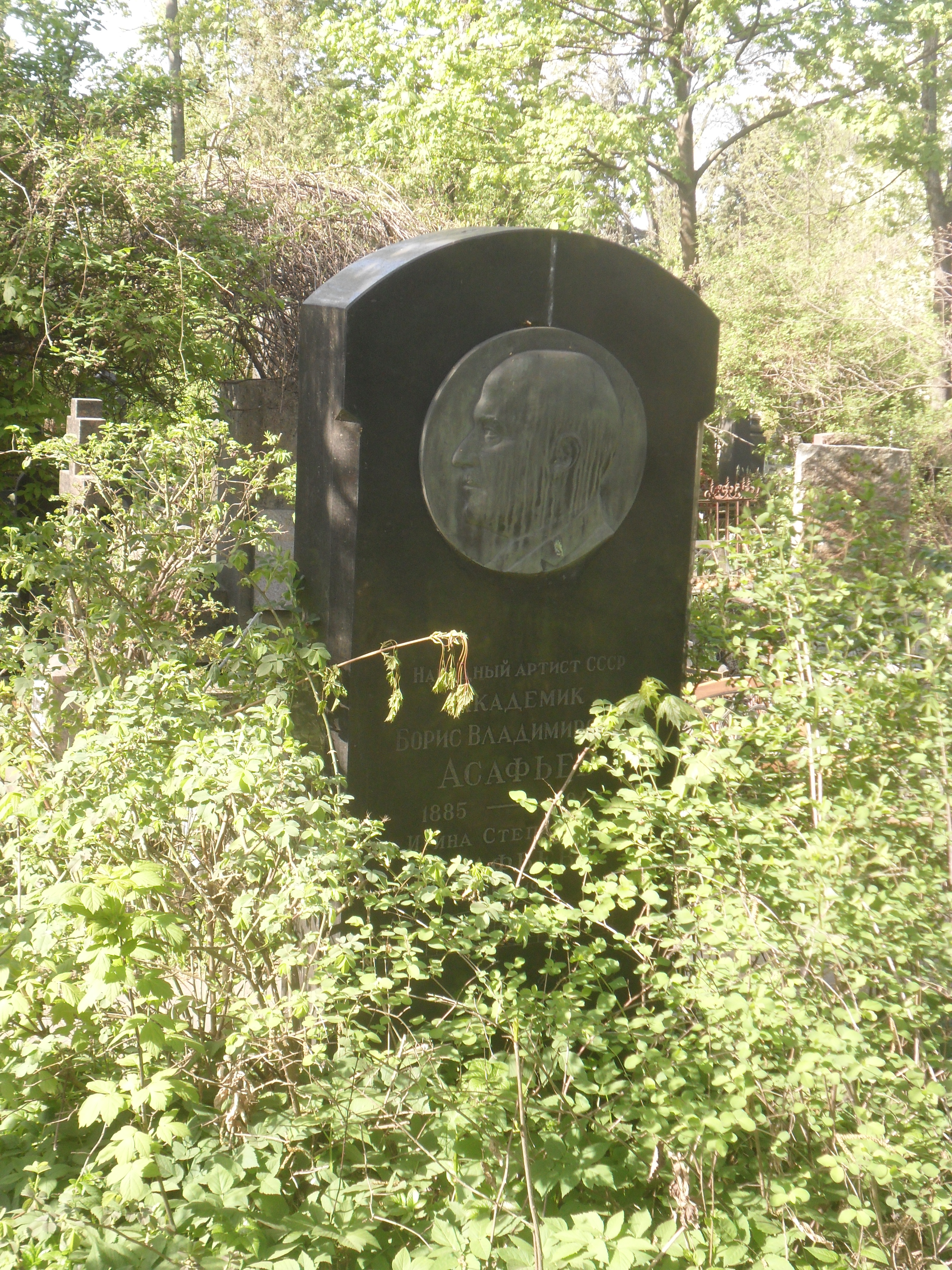
Gravestone of Asafiev at the Novodevichy Cemetery

Boris Vladimirovich Asafyev (Note: Russian: Бори́с Влади́мирович Аса́фьев, romanized: Boris Vladimirovich Asafyev) (29 July [O.S. 17 July] 1884 – 27 January 1949; also known by pseudonym Igor Glebov) (Note: Russian: И́горь Гле́бов, romanized: Igor Glebov) was a Russian and Soviet composer, writer, musicologist, musical critic and one of founders of Soviet musicology. He is the dedicatee of Prokofiev's First Symphony. He was born in Saint Petersburg.

Asafyev had a strong influence on Soviet music. His compositions included ballets, operas, symphonies, concertos and chamber music. His ballets included Flames of Paris, based on the French Revolution, and The Fountain of Bakhchisarai, which was first performed in 1934, and was performed at the Mariinsky Theatre in St. Petersburg in 2006.

His writings, under the name Igor Glebov, included The Symphonic etudes, The Book about Stravinsky and Glinka (for which he was awarded the Stalin Prize in 1948).

== Selected works ==
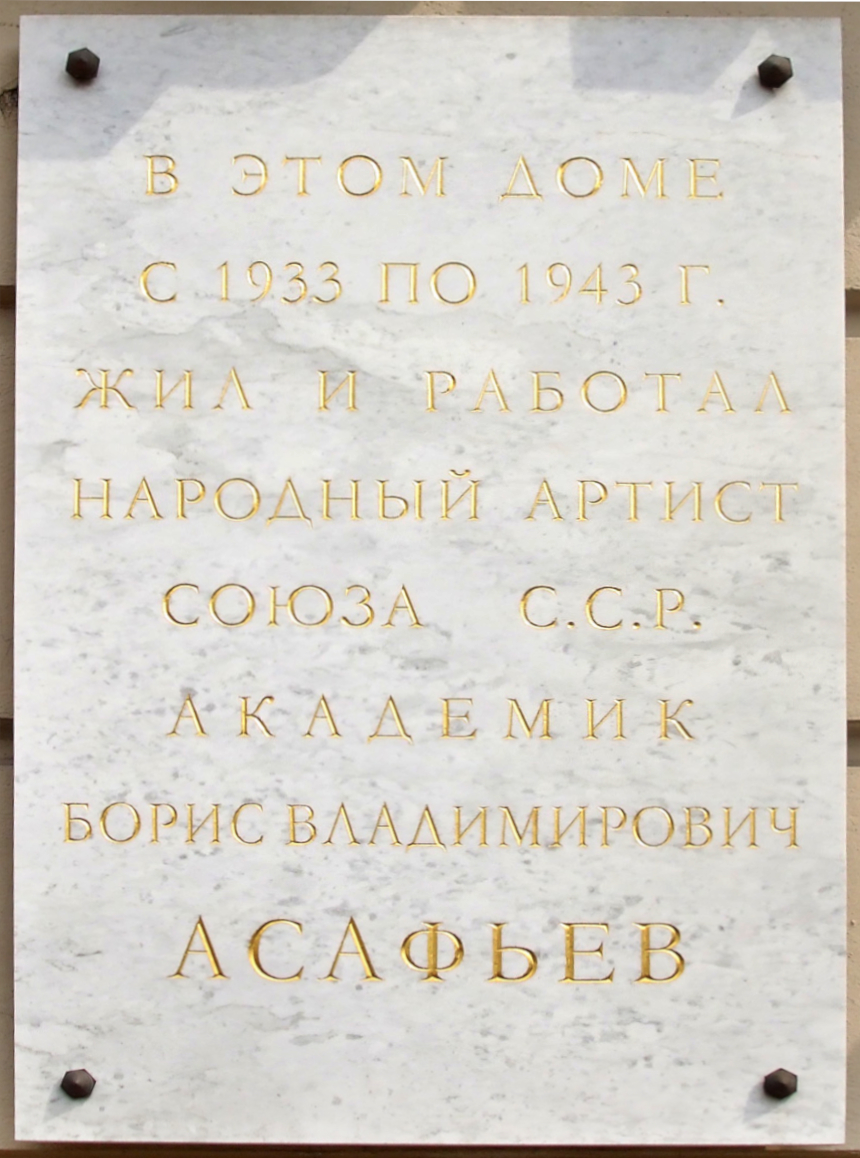
Plaque in Truda Square, Saint Petersburg, dedicated to Asafyev.

Opera

- The Cashier's Wife
- Minin and Pozharsky
- The Girl without a Dowry

Ballets

- The Fairy Gift (1910)
- White Lily (1911)
- Flames of Paris (1931)
- The Fountain of Bakhchisarai (1936)
- The Prisoner of the Caucasus (1938)
- The Rustic Lady
- The Stone Guest (1946)

Orchestra

- 5 Symphonies
- Concerto for clarinet and orchestra (1939)
- Concerto for guitar and chamber orchestra (1939)
- Concerto for piano and orchestra (1939)

Chamber music

- String Quartet (1940)
- Sonata for viola solo (1938)
- Sonata for cello and piano (1935)
- Sonata for trumpet and piano (1939)
- Sonatina for oboe and piano (1939)
- Variations for horn and piano (1940)

== See also ==
- Category:Ballets by Boris Asafyev
