= Flames of Paris =

1932 ballet by Boris Asafyev

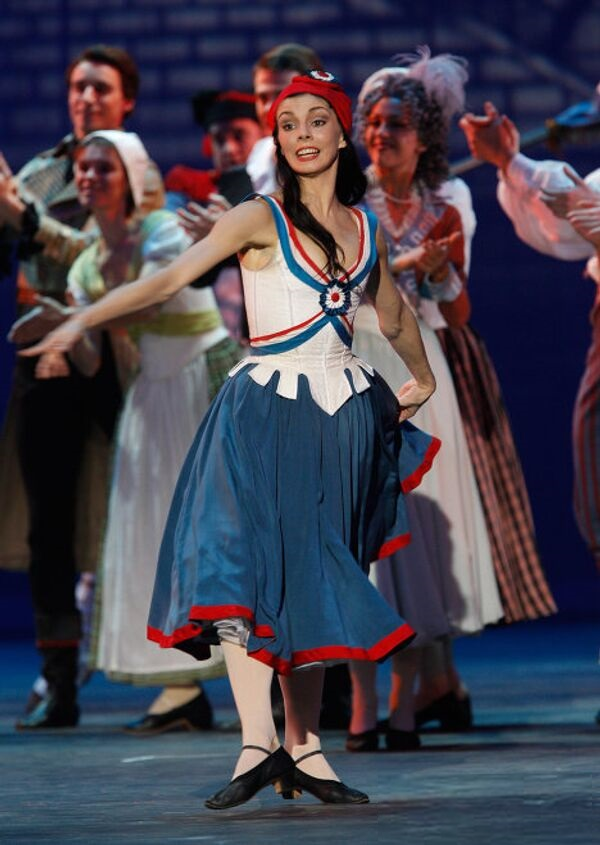
- Natalia Osipova in an extract from Flames of Paris, at the reopening gala of the Bolshoi Theatre, 2011
- Choreographer: Vasily Vainonen
- Music: Boris Asafyev
- Based on: a book by Felix Gras
- Premiere: 7 November 1932; Kirov Theatre, Leningrad
- Characters: Mireille de Poitiers; Jérôme; Jeanne; Thérèse; Mistral; Louis XVI; Marie-Antoinette
- Setting: French Revolution

Flames of Paris or The Flames of Paris (Russian: Пла́мя Пари́жа) is a full-length ballet in four acts, choreographed by Vasily Vainonen with the stage director Sergei Radlov to music by Boris Asafyev based on songs of the French Revolution. The libretto by Nicolai Volkov and Vladimir Dmitriev was adapted from a book by Felix Gras. It was premiered at the Kirov Theatre in Leningrad on 7 November 1932, with Natalia Dudinskaya as Mireille de Poitiers, Vakhtang Chabukiani as Jérôme, Olga Jordan as Jeanne, Nina Anisimova as Thérèse, and Konstantin Sergeyev as Mistral.

The Bolshoi Ballet premiered the full work on 6 July 1933 at the Bolshoi Theatre in Moscow, with Aleksey Yermolayev (Jérôme), Anastasia Abramova (Jeanne), Nadezhda Kapustina (Thérèse) and Marina Semenova (Mireille de Poitiers). The conductor was Yuri Fayer.

A new production (using some of the original choreography) was staged in 2008 by Alexei Ratmansky for the Bolshoi Ballet and is available on DVD with Ivan Vasiliev and Natalia Osipova.

In 2013 a three-act reconstruction of the Vainonen ballet was staged by Mikhail Messerer for St Petersburg's Mikhailovsky Theatre. It is based on a 1947 version done by Vainonen for the Bolshoi.

== Background ==
The Flames of Paris is a so-called "revolutionary" ballet which takes as its subject the French Revolution, including in its scenario the storming of the Tuileries Palace by the revolutionary soldiers and their victorious march on Paris. The plot is taken from the Felix Gras's Provençal language 1896 novel Li Rouge dou Miejour, which is translated into French as Les Rouges du Midi (Reds of the South).

Although the ballet's setting is eighteenth-century France, it is a perfect illustration of Soviet ballet in the 1920s and 1930s, during which time there was a determined effort to find subjects in world history which reflected the more immediate situation in the Soviet Union, and to show that the October Revolution was part of more universal movements and historical events.

== Plot outline ==
This outline is different from the plot of the ballet version revived by Alexei Ratmansky for the Bolshoi Ballet.

The ballet opens in a forest near Marseille, where the peasant Gaspard and his children, Jeanne and Pierre, are gathering firewood. When a Count and his hunting party arrive, the peasants disperse, but Jeanne attracts the attention of the Count, who attempts to embrace her. When her father intervenes, he is beaten up by the Count's servant and taken away. Next, in the city square in Marseille Jeanne tells the people what has happened to her father and the people's indignation over the injustices of the aristocracy grows. They storm the prison and free the prisoners of the Marquis de Beauregard.

At the court of Versailles a performance of the court theatre is followed by a lush banquet. The officials of the court present a formal petition to the king, requesting permission to deal with the unruly revolutionaries. Antoine Mistral, an actor in the theatre, on discovering this secret document is killed by the Marquis de Beauregard, but before he dies he manages to pass the petition on to Mireille de Poitiers, who escapes the palace as the sound of the Marseillaise is heard through the windows.

The scene shifts to a square in Paris, where an uprising and the storming of the palace is prepared. Mireille rushes in with the document revealing the conspiracy against the revolution, and her bravery is applauded. At the height of this scene, the officers of the Marquis arrive in the square; Jeanne, recognizing the man who insulted her in the woods, runs up and slaps his face. Following this, the crowd attacks the aristocrats. To the sound of revolutionary songs, the people storm the palace and burst into the staircase of the front hall. Jeanne attacks the Marquis, who is then killed by her brother, and the Basque girl Thérèse is shot to death.

Finally, back in the Paris square, the people celebrate their victory over the defenders of the Old Regime.

== Analysis ==
In creating the choreography for this ballet, Vasily Vainonen drew upon many different sources, as did the composer Boris Asafyev. The Flames of Paris blends classical and character dancing, court and folk dances, pantomime, solo performances and group scenes.

For the part of Thérèse, for example, Vainonen chose a character dancer Nina Anisimova, who displayed strong, expressive folk movements which symbolized the energy and the spirit of the crowd. On the other hand, the dances for Philippe (originally Jérôme), one of the Marseillais, and his bride are almost purely classical: the two characters dance a pas de deux which although is reminiscent of Petipa choreographic manner, is distinctly more modern and is heroic for the male.

As a further device for incorporating classical dance into production, Vainonen created the roles of Mireille de Poitiers and Antoine Mistral, a pair of performers invited by the king to appear at the banquet. The roles were originally danced by Natalia Dudinskaya and Konstantin Sergeyev and are intended for dancers capable of performing a classical pas de deux.The characters are aligned with the revolutionary crowd; following the storming of the palace and the death of Antoine Mistral, Mireille de Poitiers joins the group in dances incorporating variations and codas, alongside a corps de ballet that originally consisted of 24 dancers and was later expanded to 32. The scene at the palace of Louis XVI also contains extended mime sequences, while Mireille de Poitiers performs a minuet.

== Recordings ==
- 1953, Stars of the Russian Ballet, a Soviet film production that contains segments of the ballets Swan Lake, The Fountain of Bakhchisarai, and The Flames of Paris. Available on DVD.
- 2010, Bolshoi Ballet, with Natalia Osipova (Jeanne), Ivan Vasiliev (Philippe), Denis Savin (Jérôme), Yuri Klevtsov (Marquis de Beauregard), Pavel Sokorin (conductor). Available on DVD.

== See also ==
- List of historical ballet characters
