= Yekaterina Geltzer =

Russian ballet dancer (1876–1962)

Yekaterina Vasilyevna Geltzer (November 2, 1876 – December 12, 1962) was a Russian prima ballerina of the Bolshoi Ballet who danced in the theatre from 1898 to 1935. She was the daughter of the famous Russian dancer Vasily Geltzer.

She worked with Marius Petipa, Sergei Diaghilev, and Reinhold Glière. After the 1917 Russian Revolution, she helped to preserve the art of ballet in Russia. She was the first ballet dancer to receive the title of People's Artist of the RSFSR (1925). Her most famous post-revolutionary role was a Chinese dancer in the premiere of Glière's The Red Poppy. This production was staged by her husband Vasily Tikhomirov for her 50th birthday. In 1943, she was awarded a Stalin Prize and also received an Order of Lenin and an Order of the Red Banner of Labour.

After the divorce, Yekaterina Geltzer and Vasily Tikhomirov remained onstage partners. Once backstage at the Bolshoi Theatre, and well past the age of 60, Geltzer was heard telling her colleagues "help me get myself up en pointe, after that I know what to do."

Geltzer was once known to have a relationship with Gustaf Mannerheim, known as the Marshal of Finland. For years, there has been a rumor in Russia that Mannerheim and Geltzer would have secretly married, accidentally ended up apart, and jointly had a "son" Emil, whose descendants would still live in South America today, but Mannerheim scholars have only reacted negatively and characterized the claim just a "Russian fairy tale."

== Gallery ==
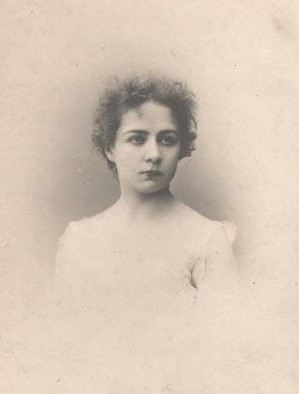
Yekaterina Geltzer. Moscow, 1890

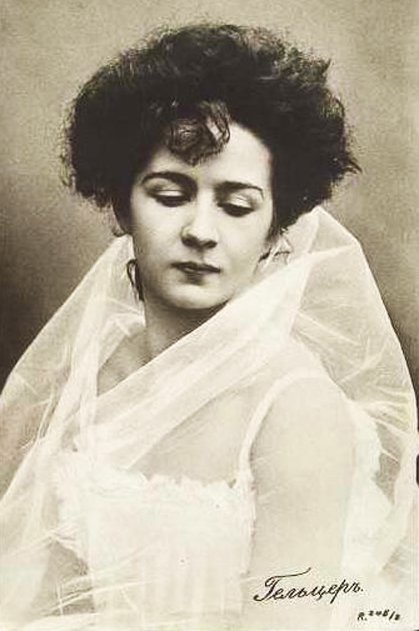
Yekaterina Geltzer. 1910

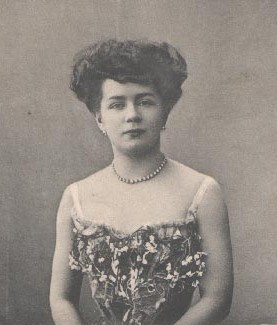
Yekaterina Geltzer. Moscow, 1920

Geltzer as Medora in Alexander Gorsky's production of Le Corsaire, 1910

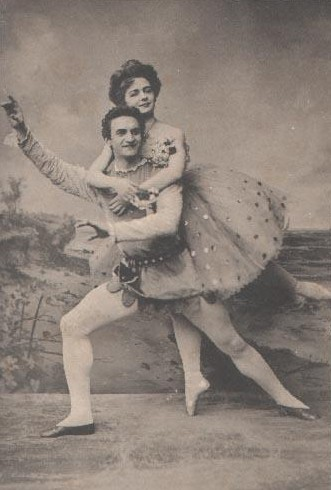
Geltzer with Tikhomirov in Nikolai Legat's The Little Scarlet Flower. Moscow, 1911

== See also ==
- List of Russian ballet dancers
