= Adam M. Phillippy =

U.S. bioinformatician

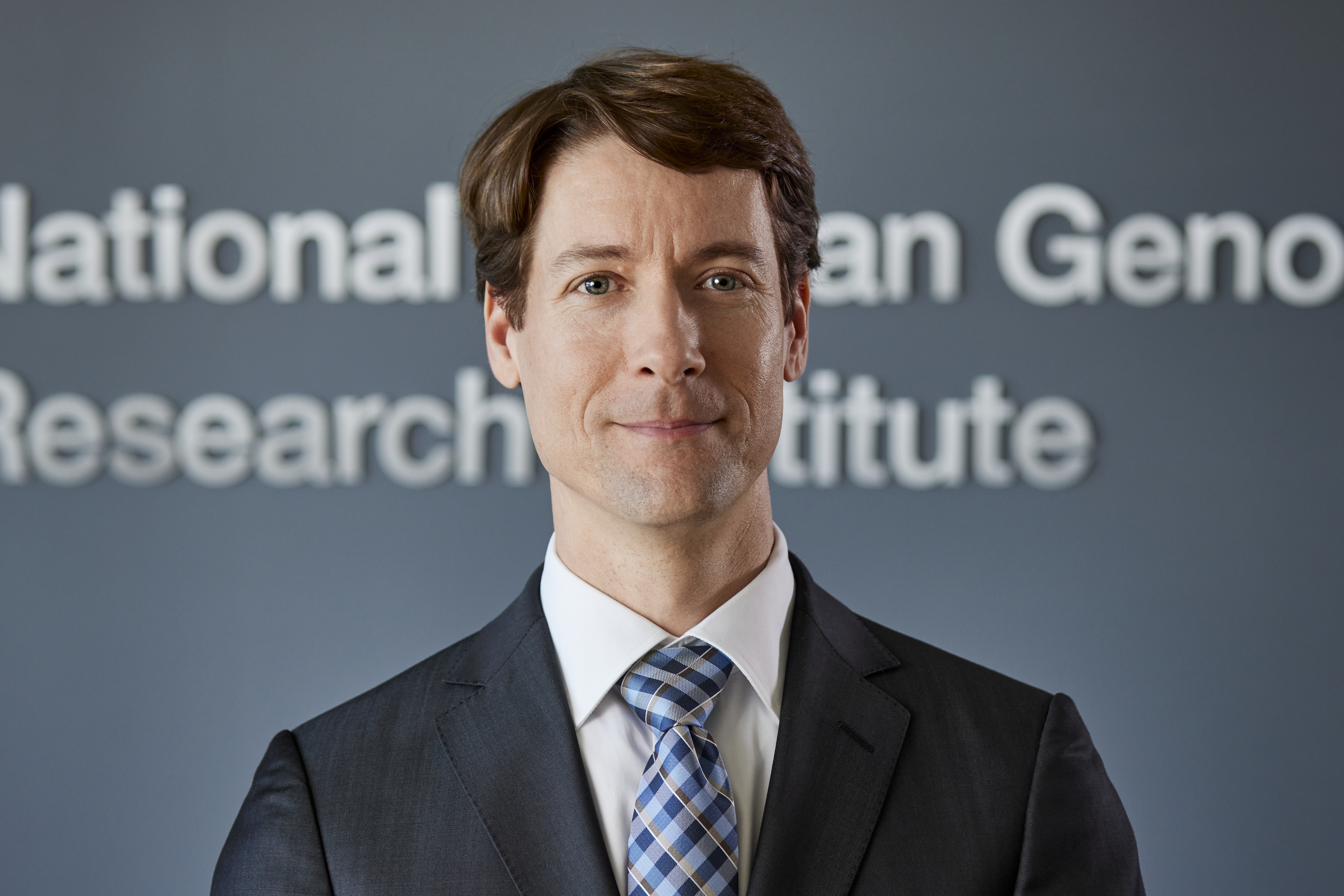

Adam M. Phillippy is an American bioinformatician serving as senior investigator and head of the Genome Informatics Section at the National Human Genome Research Institute at the National Institutes of Health. He is known for his work that resulted in the first complete sequence of a human genome.

Phillippy received his B.S. (2002) in computer science from Loyola University Maryland under the advising of Arthur Delcher and his M.S. (2008) and Ph.D. (2010) in computer science from the University of Maryland with Steven Salzberg.

He is a recipient of the U.S. Presidential Early Career Award for Scientists and Engineers, the NIH Director's Award, the Ilchun Molecular Medicine Award from the Korean Society for Biochemistry and Molecular Biology, and a distinguished alumni award from Loyola University Maryland. He was named by Time magazine as one of the world's most influential people of 2022 for his work on completing the human genome. In 2023, Phillippy, along with Sergey Koren, Arang Rhie and The Telomere-to-Telomere Team, received the Samuel J. Heyman Service to America Medal in the field of Science, Technology and Environment for "conducting the first complete assembly of the human genome".
