= Dance in the Netherlands =

There is great variety in dance in the Netherlands. The traditional dance is the Dutch folk dance; however, this is hardly practiced anymore. Many Dutch practice ballroom dancing, but also tango has a large following.

Many young girls start their dancing career with classical ballet and jazz dance.

Only a few dances are invented by the Dutch. Most of the Folk Dances are Scottish in origin. The Dutch are inventors of Hakken, which was mainly danced in the Hardcore techno and Gabber scene in the 1990s. Jumpen, which was invented in Belgium, developed further in the Netherlands. The Netherlands is one of the leading countries in the Brazilian version of zouk (a successor to lambada).

The reality show and competition Dancing with the Stars has popularized Ballroom dancing and the Dutch version of So You Think You Can Dance helps the popularity of modern dance in the Netherlands. Ice dance has been popularised by the TV shows Dancing on Ice and Sterren Dansen Op Het IJs.

== Ballet, Modern and Contemporary Dance ==
=== Choreographers ===
- Annabelle Lopez Ochoa
- Emio Greco
- Hans van Manen
- Itzik Galili
- Nicole Beutler
- Polly Cuninghame
- Rudi van Dantzig

=== Dancers ===
- Alexandra Radius
- Benjamin Feliksdal
- Hannie van Leeuwen
- Hans van Manen
- Jaap Flier
- Louis van Amstel
- Marcus van Teijlingen
- Mata Hari
- Milou Nuyens
- Polly Cuninghame
- Romy Haag
- Rudi van Dantzig
- Sonia Gaskell

=== Companies ===
- Het Nationale Ballet
- De Stilte
- ICKamsterdam
- Introdans
- Nederlands Dans Theater
- Nicole Beutler Projects
- Scapino Ballet

== Dance education ==
- AHK Amsterdamse Hogeschool voor de Kunsten
- Codarts Rotterdamse Dansacademie
- Fontys Dansacademie Tilburg
- ArtEZ Dansacademie Arnhem

== Festivals ==
- Hollands Dance Festival
- Julidans
- Nederlands Dans Dagen (Dutch Dance Days)
- Stilte Festival
