= Benjamin Feliksdal =

Dutch ballet dancer (born 1940)

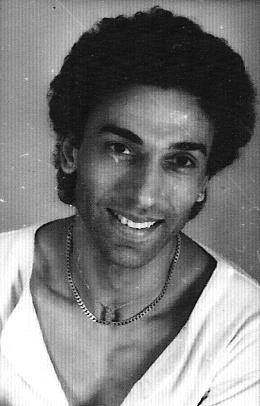
Benjamin Feliksdal

Benjamin Feliksdal (born 22 January 1940, in Den Helder) is a Dutch ballet dancer. He has danced as soloist and principal dancer with Het Nederlandse Ballet 1960, Het Nationale Ballet 1961/1971, and with the Royal Ballet of Flanders 1972/1973.

== Professional career ==
Feliksdal began his professional dance-training in 1955 in Amsterdam. He was taught classical ballet and modern dance by well-known Dutch pedagogues such as Florrie Rodrigo, Ineke Sluiter and Lucas Hoving. To finish his training he went to Rome in 1959 to study with the Dutch dancer and teacher Pieter van der Sloot and to the Rambert School of Ballet in London for special coaching. In September 1960 he joined Het Nederlands Ballet under the direction of Sonia Gaskell. One year later, in 1961, he joined the Dutch National Ballet, again with artistic leader Sonia Gaskell, and since 1965 with co-artistic leader Rudi van Dantzig. During his performing career with Het Nationale Ballet he was a principal dancer, partnering Yvonne Vendrig, Maria Bovet, Jessica Folkerts and Olga de Haas. He danced different roles with this company: Swan Lake, Von Rothbart; Romeo and Juliet, Tybaldo; Apollo, Apollo; La Bayadère, Solor; Le Prisonnier du Caucase, The Eagle; Les Présages; Suite en Blanc; Pas de Trois; The Four Temperaments; Symphony in C; Monument for a Dead Boy; The Green Table; Jungle; Night Island; Designs with Strings; Concerto Barocco; The Miraculous Mandarin; and Serenade.

== Style ==
After his dance career he specialised in methodic ballet teaching and developed as a modern jazz dance and tap teacher. He created a modern jazz dance technique based on the styles of Luigi, Mattox, and Giordano, integrating elements of jazz, ethnic, ballet, tap and modern dance. In 1975 he founded Benjamin's Modern Jazz Dance Center, European School of Jazz Dance and The Theater Dance Workshop in Amsterdam. As a former principal dancer of The Dutch National Ballet / The Royal Ballet of Flanders he became a dance-pioneer in professional modern jazz dance training in the Netherlands, East Germany 1980-1990, Soviet Union 1988-1991, Russia 1995, Bulgaria 1984-1996, Finland and in other West European countries. During the following 12 years he headed the professional training department and its allied Workshop Company. Both school and company proved to be challenging new developments in professional theater dance within the Netherlands.

== Guest teaching ==
1976-1996: As guest teacher Benjamin Feliksdal was invited by the Alvin Ailey American Dance Theater and the Dance Theater of Harlem of New York, Gus Giordano Jazz Dance Chicago, the Bat-Dor Dance Company of Tel Aviv, the Kuopio Music and Dance Festival, Finland, the Internationale Tanzwerkstatt, Bonn, the Staatliche Balletschule, Berlin, the Palucca School of Dance, Dresden, the London Contemporary Dance School, the Russian Academy of Theatre Arts of Moscow, the Leningrad State Choreographic Institute, the Moscow Chamber Ballet, and Le Ballet Jazz de Montréal.

In 1990-1991 Feliksdal was engaged as artistic director in the frame work of EURO<26 program Young Europeans Dance in Glasgow Culture City of Europe 1990 UK, which hosted 150 young dancers and two choreographers from twelve European Countries.

== Choreography Assignments ==
As a choreographer he had assignments in the Netherlands with The Theater Dance Workshop Company, Amsterdam; with Ballet Arabesque, Sofia, Bulgaria; Friedrichstadt-Palast, Berlin BRD; Bat-Dor Company and School, Tel Aviv; and TV productions in the Netherlands, Germany, Switzerland and Bulgaria.

== Jury Member ==
- 1994: Concour International De Danse de Paris, France.
- 1996: International Ballet Competition Varna, Bulgaria.
- 1997-1999: Choreography Competition, Vitebsk Belarus.
- 2009: Concorso Internazionale di Danza Modica, Italy.
- 2010: International Ballet Competition Varna, Bulgaria.

== Publications ==
Feliksdal's teaching methods and techniques have been documented in several books:

- 1984 Modern Jazzballet, Zuidboek Best, The Netherlands
- 1985 Dancercise, Bruna, The Netherlands
- 2003 Modern Tap Dance, Bekebooks ISBN 90-807699-2-4
- 2004 Syllabus Modern Jazz Dance, Bekebooks ISBN 90-807699-3-2
- 2004 Jazz, Rhythm, Body and Soul, Bekebooks ISBN 90-807699-4-0
- 2006 Syllabus Hedendaags Ballet, based on Vaganova Method, Bekebooks ISBN 90-807699-5-9
- 2009 Urban Dance-Jazzdans, Bekebooks ISBN 978-90-807699-6-0
