= Clog dance =

A clog dance is performed whilst wearing clogs. The rigid nature of the clogs and their percussive sound when dancing on a hard surface has given rise to a number of distinct styles, including the following:

- Clog dancing, a Welsh and Northern English step dance danced in clogs.
- Welsh stepdance, a style of clog dancing unique to Wales.
- Clogging, an American style which is not necessarily danced in clogs.
- Klompendansen, a Dutch style of dance.
- Morris dance, sometimes danced in clogs.
- Tap dance, which developed in part out of clog dancing.
