= Fernanda Oliveira (dancer) =

Brazilian ballet dancer

- Born: 2 August 1980 (age 44); Rio de Janeiro, Brazil
- Education: Royal Ballet Upper School
- Occupation: ballet dancer
- Years active: 2000-present
- Spouse: Fabian Reimair
- Children: 2
- Career
- Current group: English National Ballet
- Former groups: Ballet Nacional de Santiago de Chile

Fernanda Oliveira (born 1980) is a Brazilian ballet dancer. She is a lead principal with English National Ballet.

== Early life ==
Oliveira was born in Rio de Janeiro. She started ballet at age 6 as her friends were also dancing. She trained at Centro de Dança Rio, and later enrolled in the Royal Ballet Upper School in London.

== Career ==
Oliveira first danced at Ballet Nacional de Santiago de Chile. She joined English National Ballet in 2000, was promoted to soloist in 2003, first soloist in 2004, principal dancer in 2007, and lead principal in 2009. She had danced leading roles such as Odette/Odile Swan Lake, Juliet in Romeo and Juliet and the title role in Manon, and performed in one-act productions, including Etudes and In the Middle, Somewhat Elevated. She had also originated the role of Gerda in The Snow Queen and other roles in Wayne Eagling's works, and had danced at Concert for Diana. The Guardian noted she danced the Rose Adagio from The Sleeping Beauty "with supreme control", and was "gravely lyrical" in Adagio Hammerklavier.

== Selected repertoire ==
Oliveira's repertory with the English National Ballet includes:

- Odette/Odile in Swan Lake
- Clara/Sugar Plum in The Nutcracker
- Juliet in Romeo and Juliet
- Aurora in The Sleeping Beauty
- The title role in Giselle
- The title role in Akram Khan's Giselle
- The title role in Cinderella
- Stepsister Edwina in Christopher Wheeldon’s Cinderella
- The title role in Manon
- Gulnare and Medora in Le Corsaire
- In the Middle, Somewhat Elevated
- Etudes
- Petite Mort
- Adagio Hammerklavier.

=== Created roles ===
- Gerda in The Snow Queen
- Resolution
- Jeux
- No Man’s Land

== Personal life ==
Oliveira is married to English National Ballet first soloist, Fabian Reimair. They have one son and a daughter.
