= Jungle (ballet) =

Ballet by Rudi van Dantzig

Jungle is a ballet composed by the Dutch composer Henk Badings in 1959. It was choreographed by Rudi van Dantzig for the Dutch National Ballet, with sets and costumes by Toer van Schayk, and premiered on 20 December 1961 in Amsterdam.

== Sources ==
- Leo Samama, Hylke van Lingen, 2006: Nederlandse muziek in de 20-ste eeuw, p.164. AUP Salomé: Amsterdam ISBN 905356862X
- Rudi van Dantzig, 2013: Herinneringen aan Sonia Gasjkell. De Arbeiderspers ISBN 9789029587624
