= Lyubov Yegorova =

Lyubov Yegorova may refer to:

- Lyubov Yegorova (ballerina) (1880–1972), Russian ballerina
- Lyubov Yegorova (cross-country skier) (born 1966), Russian cross-country skier
