= Alexandra Radius =

Dutch ballet dancer

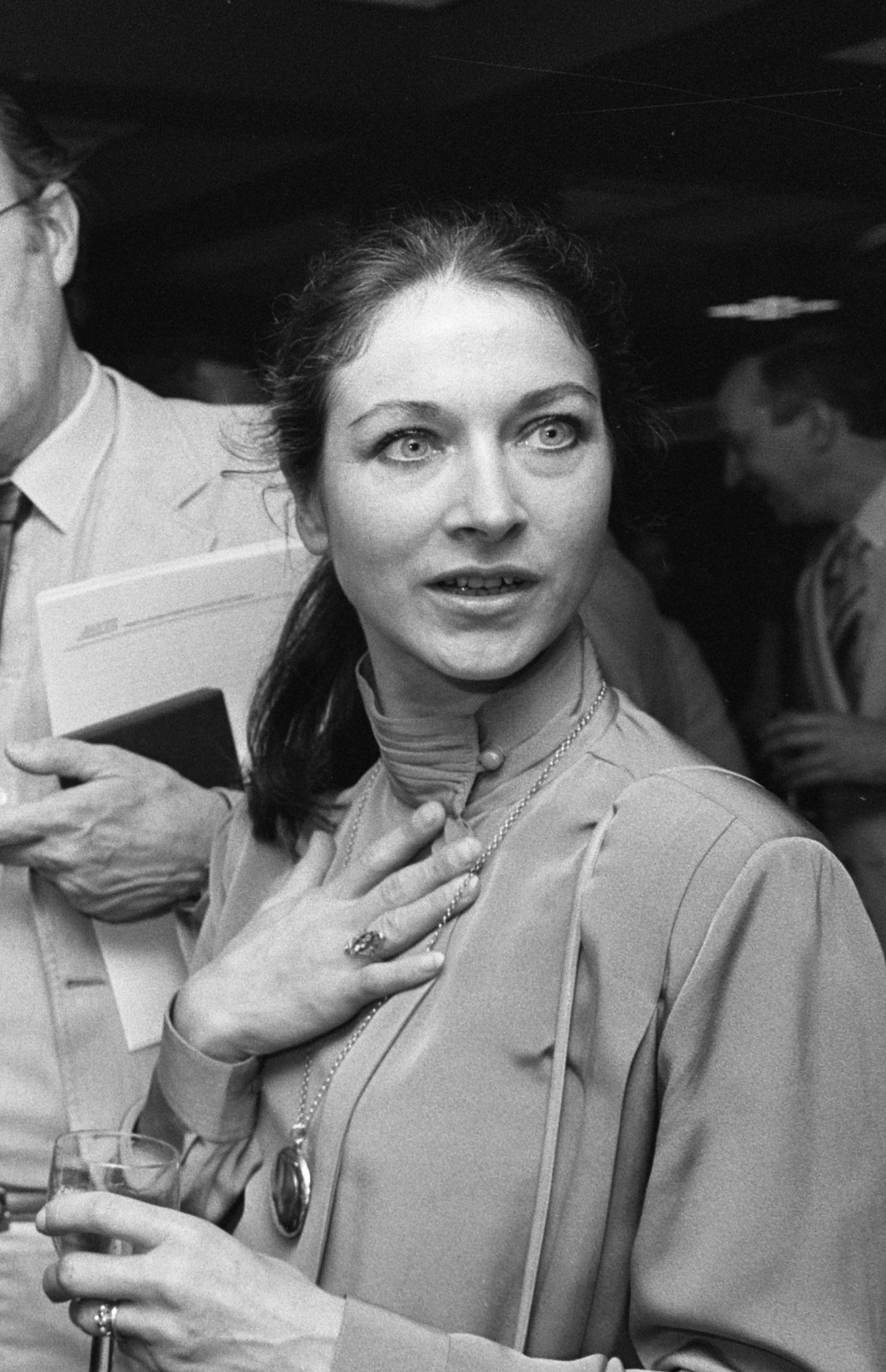
Alexandra Radius in 1983

Alexandra Mary Theodora (Lex) Radius (born 3 July 1942 in Amsterdam) is a retired Dutch ballerina.

Radius had her debut in 1957 at the Netherlands Ballet of Sonia Gaskell. There, in 1959, she met Han Ebbelaar, who would become her husband and lifelong dancing partner. Radius and Ebbelaar were soloists at the Dutch National Ballet, the Nederlands Dans Theater and, between 1968 and 1970, the American Ballet Theatre. Radius danced in classical pieces, but also in contemporary choreographies like those by Rudi van Dantzig and Hans van Manen. Her other regular dancing partners were Rudolf Nureyev, Henny Jurriëns and Alan Land. In 1990, she stopped performing ballet at the age of 48, on which occasion she was awarded the Medal of Honor for Art and Science of the Order of the House of Orange.

The Alexandra Radius Prize for rising young dance talent has been named after her.

== Literature ==
- Emmy Huf, Alexandra Radius. Han Ebbelaar. Dancing, J.M. Gottmer, Haarlem, 1979, ISBN 90-257-1209-6
- Ine Rietstap, Alexandra Radius. Een danscarrière, J.M. Gottmer, Haarlem, 1982, ISBN 90-257-1576-1
- Jessica Voeten, Springlevend! 25 jaar Dansersfonds '79: Alexandra Radius en Han Ebbelaar, Amsterdam, 2005, ISBN 90-901908-0-5

== Sources ==
- Alexandra Radius at the Theaterencyclopedie website.
