= Adagio Hammerklavier =

Ballet choreographed by Hans van Manen

- Choreographer: Hans van Manen
- Music: Ludwig van Beethoven
- Premiere: 4 October 1973; Stadsschouwburg
- Original ballet company: Dutch National Ballet
- Design: Jean-Paul Vroom

Adagio Hammerklavier is a ballet choreographed by Hans van Manen to the Adagio from Beethoven's Piano Sonata No. 29, Hammerklavier. The ballet is plotless and danced by three couples. Van Manen made Adagio Hammerklavier for the Dutch National Ballet, and it premiered on 4 October 1973, at the Stadsschouwburg, Amsterdam.

== Production ==
Van Manen decided to choreograph a new ballet on six Dutch National Ballet dancers, Monique Sand, Sonja Marchiolli, Alexandra Radius, Henry Jurriëns, Francis Sinceretti, Han Ebbelaar, when the company was rehearsing Swan Lake. Though the six were also set to dance in Swan Lake, the rehearsal schedule made them available at the same time while the rest of the company were working on the production.

Van Manen set the ballet to the Adagio, the third movement from Beethoven's Piano Sonata No. 29, Hammerklavier. He was inspired by Christoph Eschenbach's recording of the music, which was played at an exceptionally slow tempo. Van Manen explained, "I thought adagio. You hardly ever see adagio; you see slow motion, but that's different. That's based on total balance. I always think of adagio as a wheel that you push – and that moment where the wheel is still moving, just before it falls."

The costumes and set were designed by Jean-Paul Vroom, with the women in pale blue chiffon dresses, and the men in white tights, bare-chested and wearing necklaces. The decor features a white curtain at the back of the stage.

== Choreography ==
Dance critic Zoë Anderson wrote, "Like many of van Manen's works, Adagio Hammerklavier is a plotless work with a strong edge of sexual drama." She noted although the ballet was created in a time when choreographers were experimenting with complex lifts, in Adagio Hammerklavier, women are "curling and drooping to the floor." She added that in other parts of the ballet, "couples move in unison... With unexpected assertiveness walks will turn unto stamps. The dancing is understated, gaining drama from small turns of the head or changes of pose, small details that break the line of the choreography."

== Performances ==
Adagio Hammerklavier premiered on 4 October 1973, at the Stadsschouwburg, Amsterdam.

Other ballet companies performing Adagio Hammerklavier include the Royal Ballet in London, Houston Ballet, Berlin Opera Ballet, Mariinsky Ballet, English National Ballet, Stuttgart Ballet, La Scala Theatre Ballet, Pennsylvania Ballet and Northern Ballet.
