= Jaap Flier =

Dutch dancer and choreographer (1934–2022)

- Born: 27 February 1934; Scheveningen, Netherlands
- Died: 18 March 2022 (aged 88)
- Known for: Dance and choreography
- Movement: Ballet

Jaap Flier (27 February 1934 – 18 March 2022) was a Dutch dancer and choreographer.

== Life and career ==
Flier was born in Scheveningen, Netherlands, and studied with Sonia Gaskell. He made his debut as a dancer in 1950 with Ballet Recital and then took a dance position with Netherlands Ballet. He made his debut as choreographer with The Trial in 1955. He also appeared as a dancer in the film Karneval in 1961.

Flier was a founding member of Netherlands Dance Theatre in 1959 and worked as one of its principal dancers. He served as director of the Australian Dance Theatre from 1973 to 1975 and director of the Dance Company (NSW) in Sydney from 1975 to 1976. He then returned to the Netherlands where he worked teaching dance.

In 1968, he was honored as Knight of the Order of Orange-Nassau.

== Works ==
Selected works include:

- Nouvelles aventures (music by Ligeti, 1968)
- Hi-kyo (music by Kazuo Fukushima, 1971)
