= Dutch folk dance =

Traditional dances performed by the folk

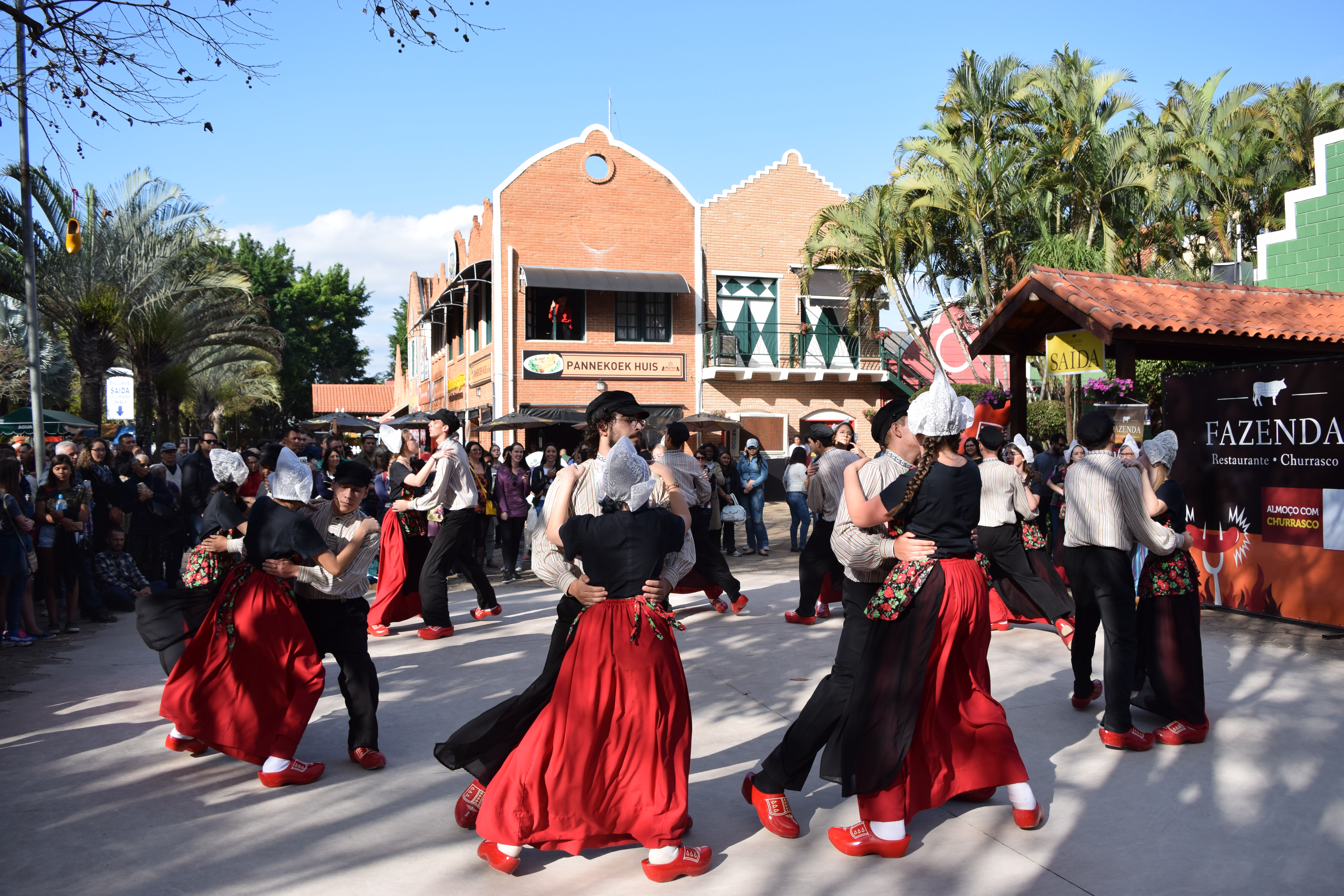
Dutch folk dance performance in Holambra, Brazil.

Dutch folk dance encompasses traditional dances that were performed by the folk.

While foreigners and the Dutch often associate Dutch folk dance with clog dancing, clogs actually limit the range of dance moves. Consequently, the dance is typically performed in shoes. Historically, the Dutch folk dance was part of their Church going attire, which included shoes. Clogs were reserved for work, but during harvest feasts following the harvest, farmers would dance in clogs, as they had been wearing them throughout the day.

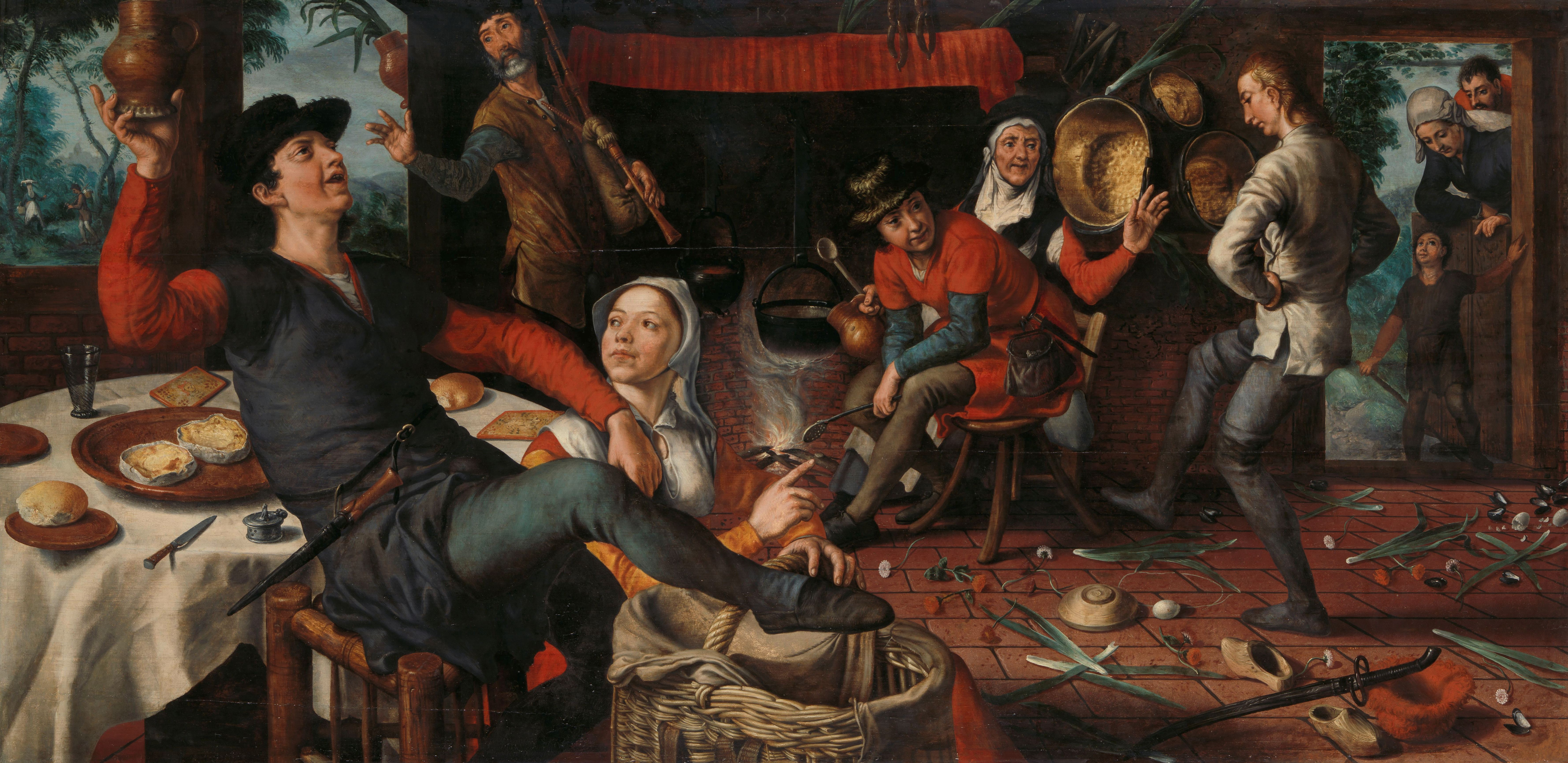
Pieter Aertsen, The Egg Dance (1552)

In the East of the Netherlands dances like Driekusman, Hoksebarger, Veleta, Kruispolka and the Spaanse Wals share the origin with German dances, but some are even danced in countries further away, like Poland and Lithuania. Or at least using the same melodies. The actual dances may differ. The "Veleta" used to be a common dance in many parts of the Netherlands during the 1950s till the 1970s on weddings and even in dancings, just like the ballroom dances Waltz, Quickstep and Tango.

Nowadays, new folk dances are still being created. It concerns new dance moves (patterns) that borrow from the traditional dances.

Folk dances are not often danced anymore. Some old-fashioned farmer weddings still feature them, and in old people homes the dances are used as exercise. Nevertheless, there are quite a few folk dance groups still performing Dutch folk dances. There are two kinds of folk dance groups in the Netherlands: those who want to preserve the traditional local dances, with mainly elderly dancers (50+) and there are less of these groups by time. And those who want to show Dutch folklore on stage with new choreographies based on the original material. The latter ones usually have younger dancers from the age of 8 till 50, and often go to festivals in the Netherlands and abroad.

== See also ==
- Klompendansen
- Dance in the Netherlands
