= Nederlands Dans Theater =

Contemporary dance company

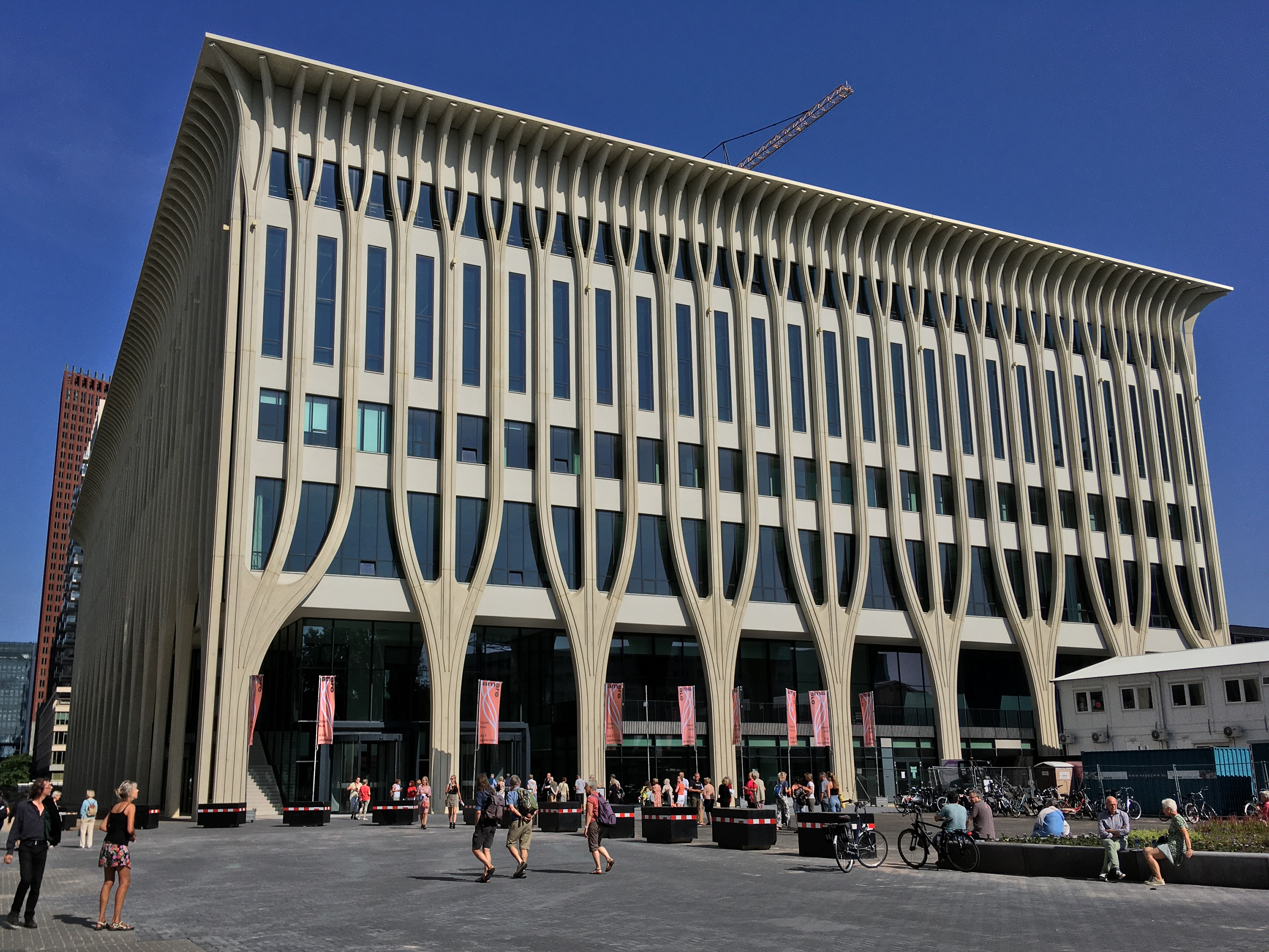
Amare building, The Hague, home to NDT since September 2021

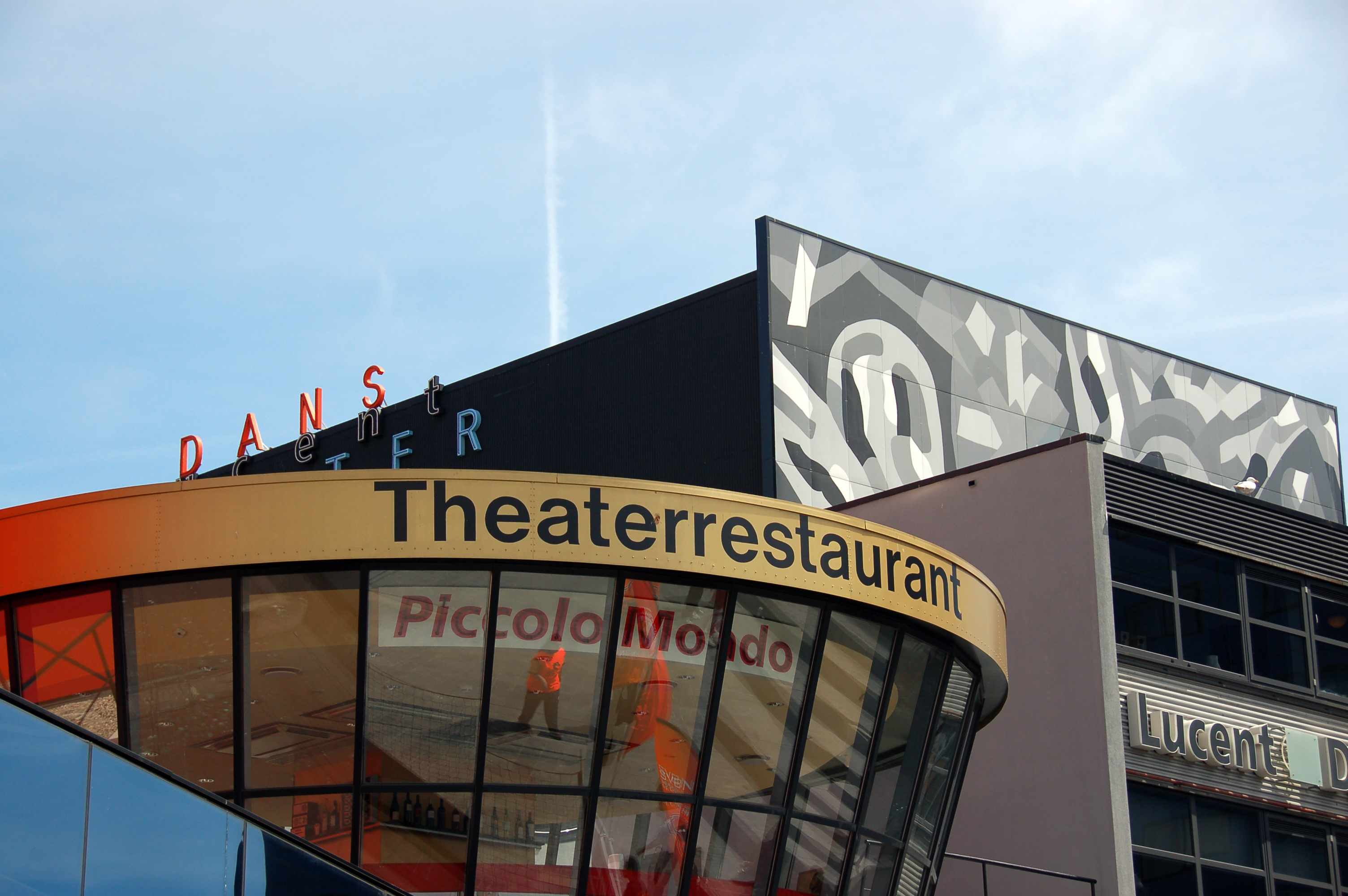
Lucent Danstheater, designed by Rem Koolhaas, former location of NDT

Nederlands Dans Theater (NDT; literal translation Netherlands Dance Theatre) is a Dutch contemporary dance company. NDT is headquartered at the Amare building in The Hague. NDT also performs at other venues in the Netherlands, including Amsterdam's Het Muziektheater and Nijmegen's Stadsschouwburg. NDT comprises two dance companies: Nederland Dans Theater I, Nederland Dans Theater II.

== History ==
Nederlands Dans Theater (NDT) was founded in 1959 by Benjamin Harkarvy, Aart Verstegen, and Carel Birnie. together with a group of 18 members of the Dutch National Ballet (which was directed by Sonia Gaskell). Their intention was to break away from the more traditionally oriented Dutch National Ballet (Het Nederlands Ballet). NDT focused onto new ideas and experimentation with the exploration of new forms and techniques of dance.

In 1961 the Nederlands Dans Theater got subsidy from the city of The Hague and from the government. In the 1960s the NDTs repertoire comprised classical dance with a strong influence by American modern dance. The NDT got unprecedented recognition and success with the guidance of different persons like Hans van Manen and Jiří Kylián as artistic directors. In the first years of the 1970s there was no clear policy because of various conflicts within the board of the NDT. That changed when in 1975 Jirí Kylian entered the board as artistic leader.

The Nederlands Dans Theater had been based in the Lucent Danstheater at the Spui in The Hague from 1987 until its demolition in October 2015. The new Amare building, located roughly at the site of the former Lucent Danstheater, was opened in September 2021 and is home to NDT, the Koninklijk Conservatorium and the Residentie Orkest.

Many of the founding NDT dancers have made their mark on Dutch ballet and dance:

- Gérard Lemaître was knighted Order of Orange-Nassau by Queen Beatrix. He retired in 1982 but returned as dancer of the NDT III company until 2006.
- Charles Czarny, Martinette Janmaat and Mabel Alter became well known ballet teachers at the conservatoires and dance academies in Rotterdam and Amsterdam
- Martinette Janmaat was artistic director for the Contemporary dance department at the Nationale Ballet Academy in Amsterdam and teacher at Rambert Dance Company
- Mabel Alter founded the Mabel Alter Balletschool in 1970 which later became home of Summerschool Den Haag, international school for dance with a.o. teachers from NDT.

The first group of dancers also included:

- Willy de la Bije
- Aart Verstegen
- Jaap Flier
- Pepita Goedemans
- Milly Gramberg
- Mabel Alter
- Hannie van Leeuwen
- Annemarie Verhoeven
- Alexandra Radius
- Olga Dzialiner
- Marianne Westerdijk
- Hans van Manen
- Rudi van Dantzig
- Hans van der Togt
- Han Ebbelaar

== Artistic directors ==
- Benjamin Harkarvy (1959–1969) as choreographer and artistic co-director (with Hans van Manen). He went on to be the co-director of the Dutch National Ballet and from 1992 he became the director of the Dance Division of The Juilliard School in New York.
- Hans van Manen (1961–1970) He was connected to the NDT from 1960 until 1971 as a dancer (until 1963) and after that as a choreographer and artistic leader. He was also a freelancer at the Nationaal Ballet, as a choreographer. He came back in 1988 as house choreographer at the Nederlands Dans Theater. His repertoire comprises more than 120 ballets (62 of which were choreographed for the Nederlands Dans Theater).
- Jaap Flier (1970–1973) became the new artistic director. For this job he stopped dancing but once in a while he made choreographies himself.
- Hans Knill (1975–1977) has worked together for 2 years as artistic director with Jiří Kylián.
- Jiří Kylián (1975–2004), the second artistic director, brought unprecedented recognition and success to NDT. His time as artistic director was from 1975 to 1999 – after he stepped down as artistic director, he remained with NDT as chief choreographer and artistic adviser.

Glenn Edgerton joined HSDC after an international career as a dancer and director. He began his dancing career at The Joffrey Ballet where, mentored by Robert Joffrey, he performed leading roles in the company's contemporary and classical repertoire for 11 years. In 1989, Edgerton joined the acclaimed Nederlands Dans Theater, and after dancing for five years retired from performing to become artistic director of the main company, leading NDT1 for a decade and presenting the works of Jiri Kylian, Hans van Manen, William Forsythe, Ohad Naharin, Mats Ek, Nacho Duato, Jorma Elo, Johan Inger, Paul Lightfoot and Sol Leon, among others.

- Marian Sarstädt (1962–1972/1999–2004) has been a dancer and a staff member of the artistic council as adjunct-director and she made a great contribution to the NDT.
- Anders Hellström (2004–2009) trained at the Royal Swedish Ballet School and danced with the Royal Swedish Ballet and the Hamburg Ballet. He also danced with William Forsythe's Ballett Frankfurt from 1993 to 1999 before taking over as artistic director of Sweden's Goteburg Ballet.
- Jim Vincent (James Francis Vincent Jr.) (2009–2012) He danced for the NDT from 1978 until 1990. After that he went to Spain where he danced from 1990 until 1994 and he was the adjunct-director. After this he worked in Lyon (Opera ballet) and Disneyland Resort Paris (director "corporate and Special Events"). In 2000 he became artistic director of the Hubbard Street Dance Chicago. And in 2009 he became the artistic director of the NDT.
- Paul Lightfoot, who danced with NDT since 1985, and who is resident choreographer since 2002, has been appointed artistic director as of January 2012.
- Emily Molnar was appointed artistic director in August 2020.

== Resident choreographers ==
Jiří Kylián, Paul Lightfoot and Sol León (the two of them also referred to as Lightfoot León).

== Guest choreographers ==
The Nederlands Dans Theater collaborates with many guest choreographers, including: Hans van Manen, Johan Inger, Crystal Pite, Lukáš Timulak, Cayetano Soto, Marco Goecke, Medhi Walerski, Ohad Naharin, Tero Saarinen, Wayne McGregor and William Forsythe.

== Three companies ==
=== NDT I ===
Nederland Dans Theater I (30 dancers) was founded in 1959. The dancers all have solo qualities and are not divided into categories. Besides works of Jiří Kylián and Lightfoot León the repertoire of Nederland Dans Theater I comprises a large number of works by choreographers such as Nacho Duato, Mats Ek, William Forsythe, Crystal Pite and Ohad Naharin.

=== NDT II ===
Nederlands Dans Theater II (16 dancers) was founded in 1978 for dancers between 17 and 22, original name was 'De Springplank'. Alongside ballets by Hans van Manen and Jiří Kylián, much work by young choreographic talent is performed.

=== NDT III ===
By initiative of Jiří Kylián a new group was set up in 1991, especially for dancers of 40 years and older. This group became legendary in the dance world. But because there was not enough structural subsidy to keep up the activities of Nederlands Dans Theater III as a permanent part of the company, the management and Board of Nederlands Dans Theater decided in 2006 to discontinue Nederlands Dans Theater III in its current form. Plans to continue the group and realize new projects are being investigated.

== Repertoire ==
Besides works of Jiří Kylián and Lightfoot León, the NDT performs works choreographed by Jacopo Godani, Ohad Naharin, Mats Ek, William Forsythe, and Crystal Pite. Both NDT I and II tour in the Netherlands and abroad with various shows.

== Awards ==
The Nederlands Dans Theater, the choreographers, the dancers and the groups have won several awards. Both Hans van Manen and Jiří Kylián are crowned as Officers in the Order of Orange Nassau by Queen Beatrix. In the Netherlands itself, the Nederlands Dans Theater has received the VSCD award (Vereniging van Schouwburgen en ConcertgebouwDirecties) twelve times. The Zwaan awards for "most impressive dance production 2009" and for "most impressive dance performance 2009" have been handed to the Nederlands Dans Theater. In foreign countries the NDT has also won several awards, including the Nijinsky Awards. The choreographers (Hans van Manen, Jiří Kylián) and the NDT I have won awards on the prestigious Edinburgh International Festival.
