= Clog dancing =

Folk dance from Wales and England

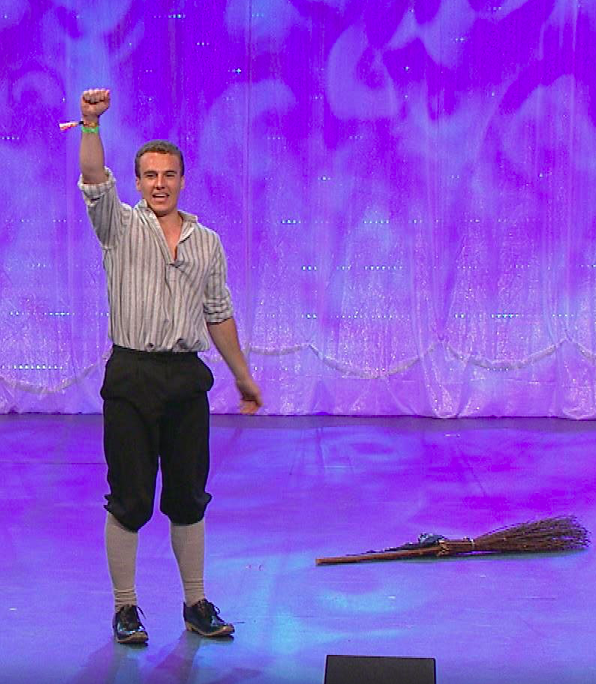
Welsh clog dancer on stage at the National Eisteddfod in Bodedern, 2017.

Clog dancing is a form of step dance characterised by the wearing of inflexible, wooden soled clogs. Clog dancing developed into differing intricate forms in Wales and in the North of England. Welsh clog dancing mainly originates from various slate mines where workers would compete against each other during work breaks. Northern English traditional clog dancing originates from Lancashire, Yorkshire, County Durham, Northumberland and the Lake District.

Welsh and English clogs, with leather uppers and a sole cut from alder or sycamore were the regular, everyday footwear for working people all over Britain until the 1920s. Dancing clogs are close fitting which allows the dancer more control over the movements of their feet. English clogs with an iron or rubber protective layer on the sole are also worn for North West morris.

The main focus of a step dancer is in the footwork: dancers can create many different types of sound using their feet alone. Clog dancing was often performed very casually, people would dance at home, in the pubs or in the street. The upper part of the body was kept relatively motionless so it required little space.

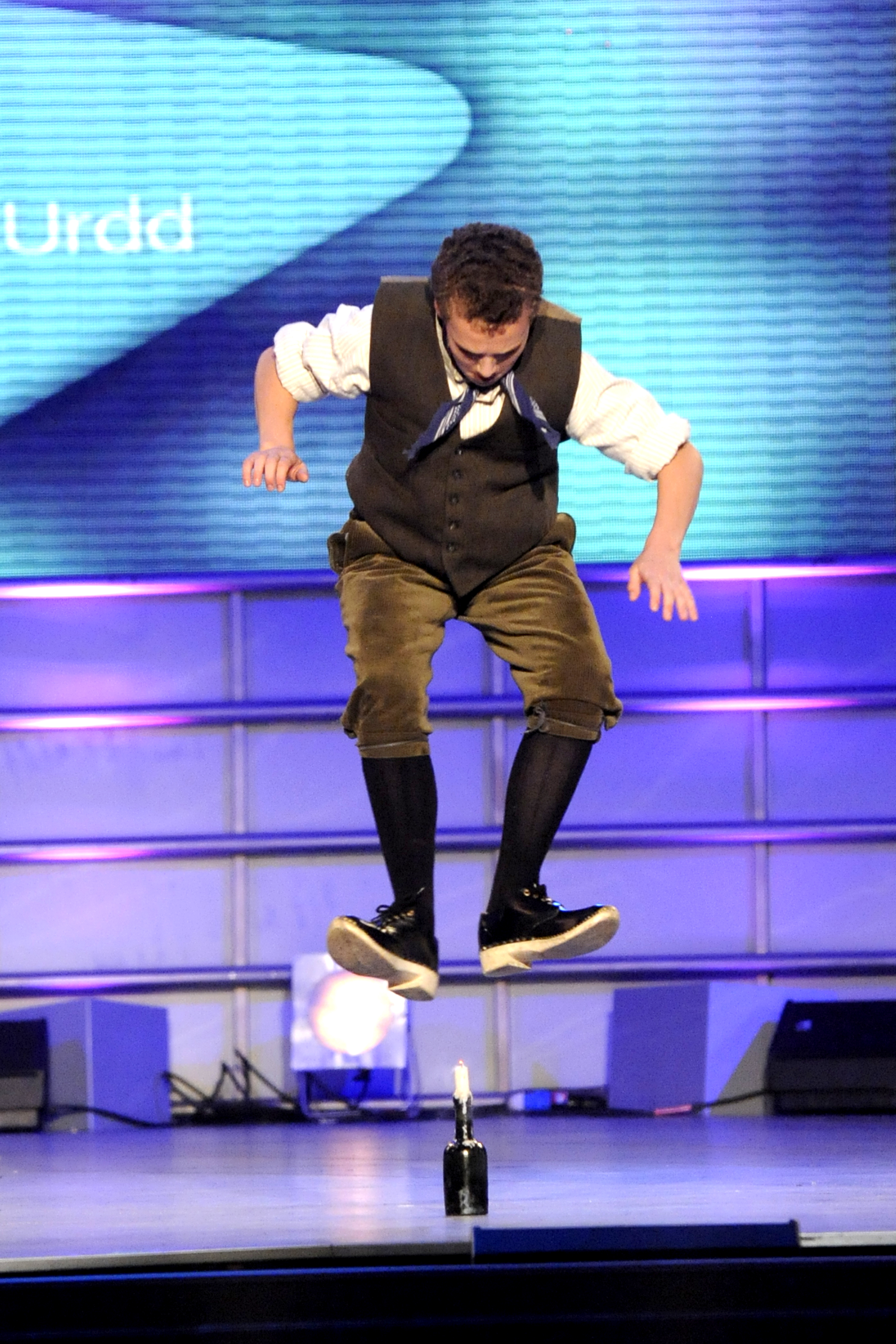
A Welsh solo clog dancer extinguishing a candle using the sole edges of his clogs at the National Urdd Eisteddfod in Snowdonia (Eryri), 2012.

In the 1800s, clog dancing competitions became popular. Large amounts of money could be won or lost on the clog competitions which were seen as a type of sport. Like modern-day jockeys, dancers would perform in colours which would have made them easy to identify. Both men and women danced in breeches which would have allowed their leg movements to be seen. Clog dancing was also performed on the stage. In the Victorian period clog dancing was a popular act in music halls or variety shows. Often people would wear special themed costumes as part of their act. The famous comedian Charlie Chaplin started his career in music halls as a clog dancer.

Welsh Clog dancing tradition is unbroken and continues to exist in many festivals in Wales, mainly the National "Eisteddfodau". These include the Urdd National Eisteddfod, the National Eisteddfod of Wales and the Llangollen International Eisteddfod. Both the Urdd and National Eisteddfod occur in a different part of Wales each year. The competitive Welsh style of dance varies from stylised group dancing to a more traditional and natural dancing scene. Welsh clog dancing is also performed individually by both men and women. The male style of dance is particularly dynamic, including so-called "tricks" usually performed at the end of a performance. Solo Welsh male dancers are therefore required to have far more athletic abilities when compared with the English clog dancer.

English clog dancing traditions still exist in some festivals in Northumbria, and are danced to the traditional music of the region. Clog dancing is also still practised in parts of Lancashire, Cheshire, Yorkshire, Cumbria and Derbyshire and there are teams dancing the Northern traditional dances (and newer ones) in many other parts of England. Clog dance competitions currently held in England include the Lancashire and Cheshire Clog Dancing Contests (focussing on Lancashire style clog dancing) held every September as part of the Fylde Folk Festival in Fleetwood, and the Northern Counties Clog Dancing Championships (focussing on Durham and Northumberland style clog dancing) held every year in Tyne and Wear.

== British tradition ==
=== English clog dancing ===
Today, there are three predominant styles of English clog dancing.

- Northumberland and Durham style: bears a resemblance to Irish dancing. It is characterised by neat and precise body movements with almost no upper-body movement. Dancers wear flat clogs with heel beat steps forming a large part of the repertoire.
- Lancashire style: very distinct from Northumbrian clogging and more flamboyant in style. Dancers' heels are kept well off the ground; in tournaments heel steps lead to disqualification. Danced in 'Dandy' clogs with the extra eyelets, crimping and pointy toes.
- Lakeland style or Westmorland Reel: typically danced as a reel with eight bars of stepping followed by a reel of three.
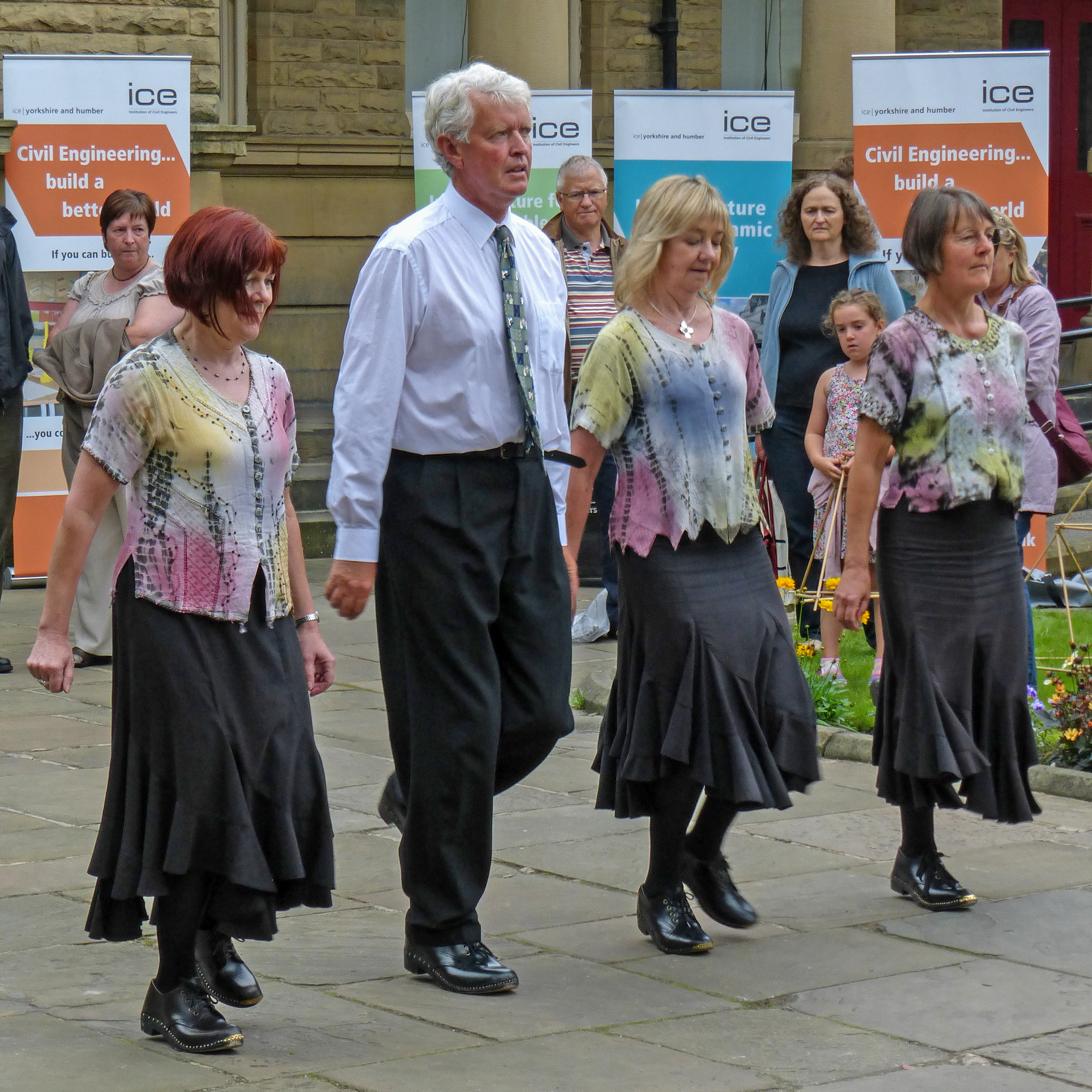
  Four English clog dancers, at Saltaire

==== History ====
English clog dancing began in 18th century England during the Industrial Revolution. It is thought to have developed in the Lancashire cotton mills where wooden-soled clogs were preferred to leather soles because the floors were kept wet to help keep the humidity high, important in cotton spinning. At their breaks and lunches, they would have competitions, where they were judged on the best rhythm patterns. Workers, wearing their working clogs would perform in the street, in pubs, and during social occasions. For example, in Lancashire, wooden-soled clogs were worn in the mills, and on Dartmoor, hard-soled leather shoes or boots would have been worn for farming. By the late 1800s they clog danced on proper stages at competitions. In these competitions, the judges would watch the routine and judge it according to footwork, precision, and technique. Clog dancers were a common sight at music halls throughout the 19th century and into the early 20th century. One such group was The Eight Lancashire Lads which included a young Charlie Chaplin as one of its members. Dan Leno became the world champion clog dancer in the 1880s, although records show that competitive clog dancing was a frequent occurrence throughout the 19th century.

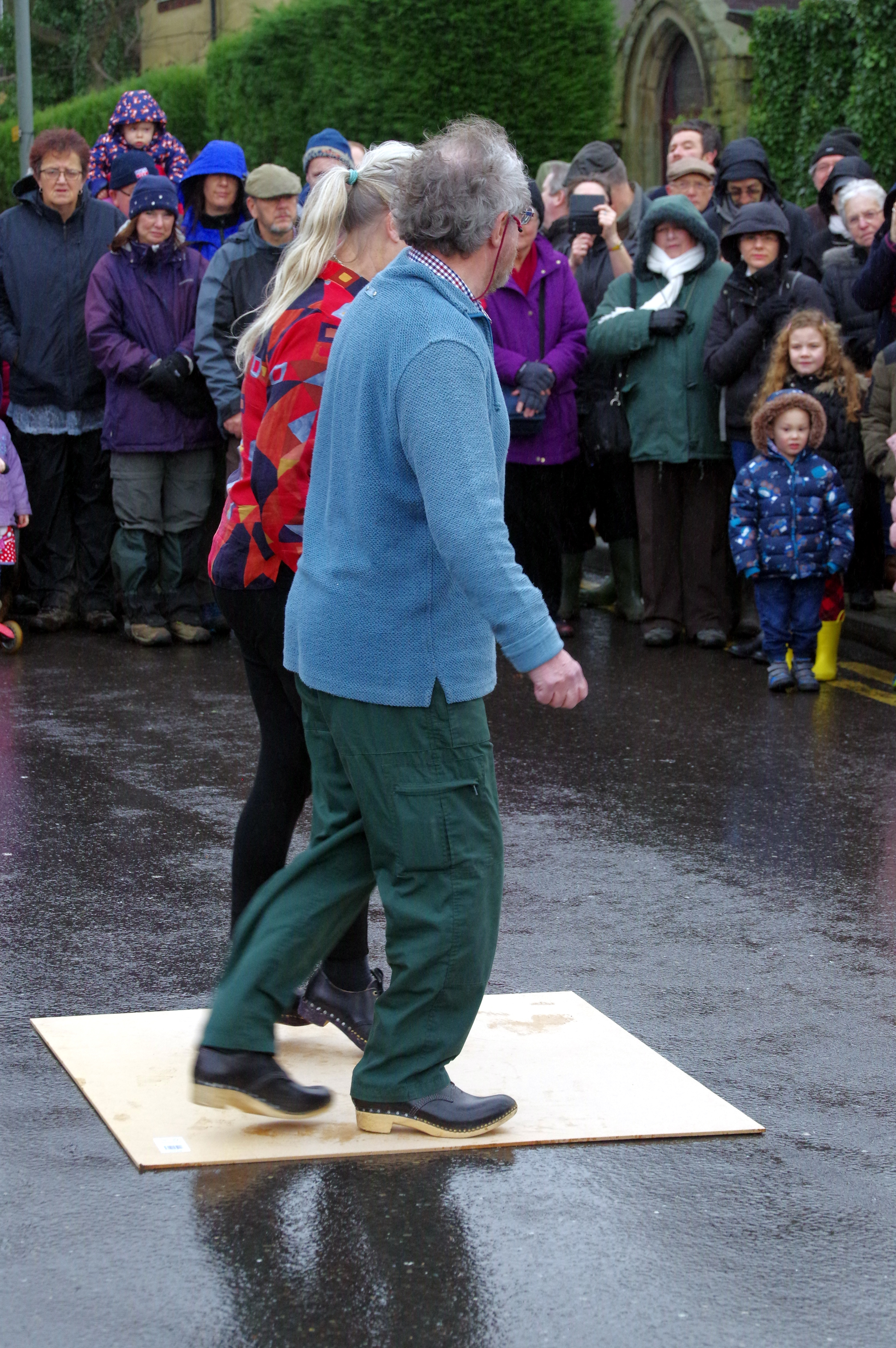
English clog and step dancers in Grenoside, Sheffield.

Cecil Sharp frequently encountered step dancing, clog dancing and North West morris dancing (a type of morris often performed in clogs, but not the same as clog dancing) in his search for folk dances in England, but it was Maud Karpeles who was more effective in documenting some of these dances. She encountered groups of North West morris dancers in the North-West of England. Her book The Lancashire Morris Dance was published in 1930. It contained arrangements of the common Morris tunes: Rush cart lads, The girl I left behind me, Corn rigs, Sawney was tall – Radstock jig, Balquhidder lasses, Shepton hornpipe, Nancy Dawson and Cross Morris. In 1911 John Graham had published Lancashire and Cheshire Morris Dances from the same area. In the United States, English clog steps were combined with African rhythms to form "buck and wing dancing", and that evolved into Tap dance. (Note: Buck and wing dancing: The "wing" referred to is the step where a foot is kicked out to one side, striking the ground as it goes. The Buck was the young African male.) Nowadays, clogs, tap shoes, and hard-soled shoes are all worn depending on the style of dance. Dances and steps are most notably found in the North East, the Lake District, and Lancashire. As well as being danced in social settings, there are also some competitions, which has helped define some of the styles.Competition style dancing is often focused on very precise footwork with very little upper-body movement.

==== Costume ====
Clog dancers today wear a mixture of costumes inspired by the Victorian and Edwardian clothing of the northern workers. In Lancashire and Northumbria some female clog dancers have specially made costumes, often with a waistcoat or bodice which is worn with a shawl, a long skirt, and an apron typically embroidered with floral patterns. Dancers also wear contemporary clothing and fashion. Pat Tracey (1959) described the everyday clothing worn by clog dancers performing in streets in the early 20th century;"For their performance the dancers usually wore their normal working clothes – brown fustian trousers, striped shirt with red muffler knotted round the neck, navy blue jacket and soft cap. They danced in their everyday clogs though these were usually somewhat lighter in weight than those worn by the majority of weavers...the street dancers normally belonged to a set of rather dandified working youths and the lighter clog was part of their accepted dress." Some dancers now wear mill workers working clothing or Sunday best, whilst others wear more modern outfits. On Dartmoor, in East Anglia and in the Romany/Gypsy and Traveller community, everyday clothing is worn.

==== Current tradition and festivals ====
Clog dancing still occurs in some festivals in North East England where it is typically danced to the traditional music of Northumbria. Dancing traditions still exist in Lancashire, Cheshire, Yorkshire, Cumbria and Derbyshire and other parts of England. Clog dance competitions currently held in England include the Lancashire and Cheshire Clog Dancing Contests (focussing on Lancashire style) held every September as part of the Fylde Folk Festival in Fleetwood, and the Northern Counties Clog Dancing Championships (focussing on Durham and Northumberland style clog dancing) held every year in Tyne and Wear.

=== Welsh clog dancing ===
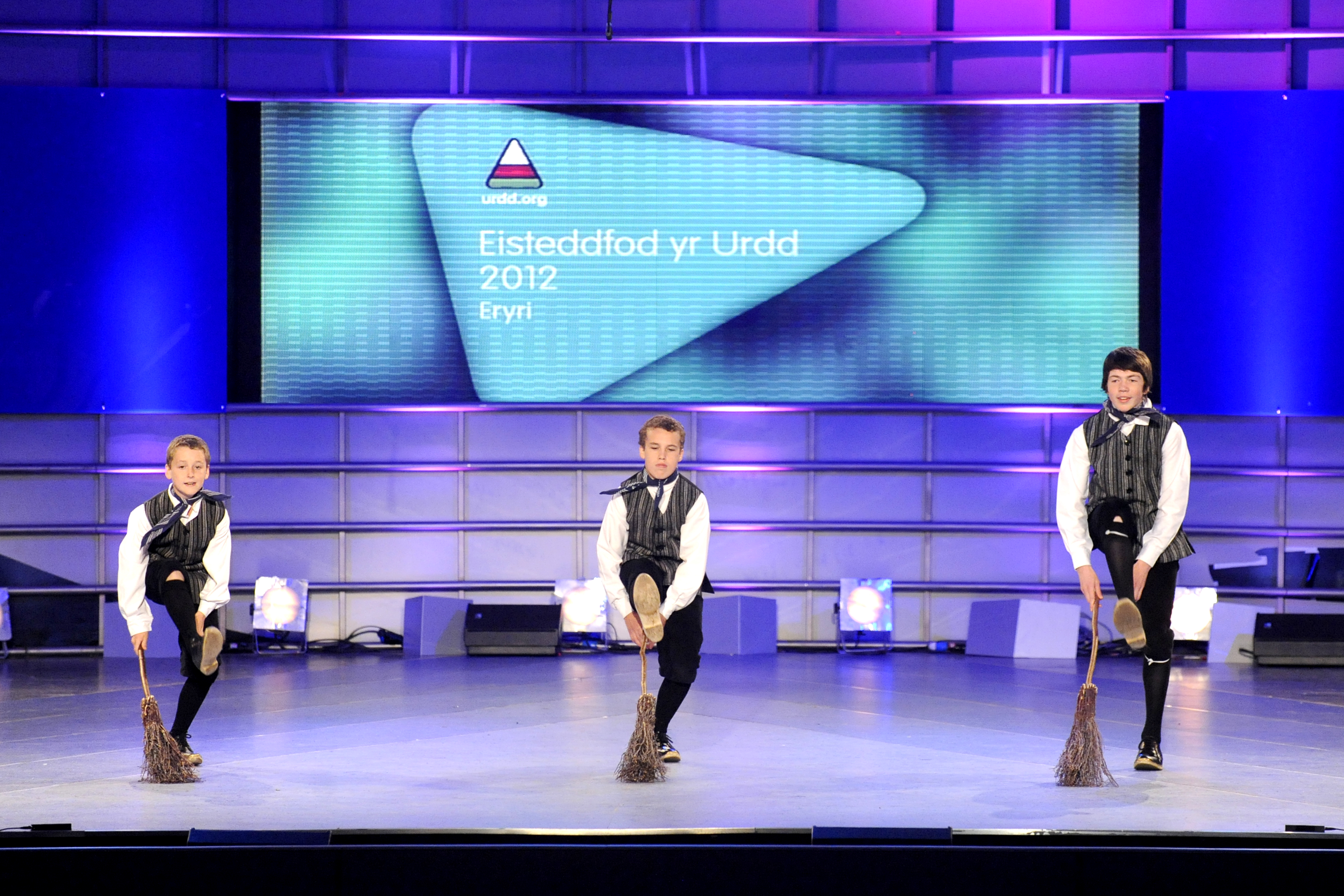
A Welsh clog dancing trio performing in the National Urdd Eisteddfod, 2012 Snowdonia (Eryri).

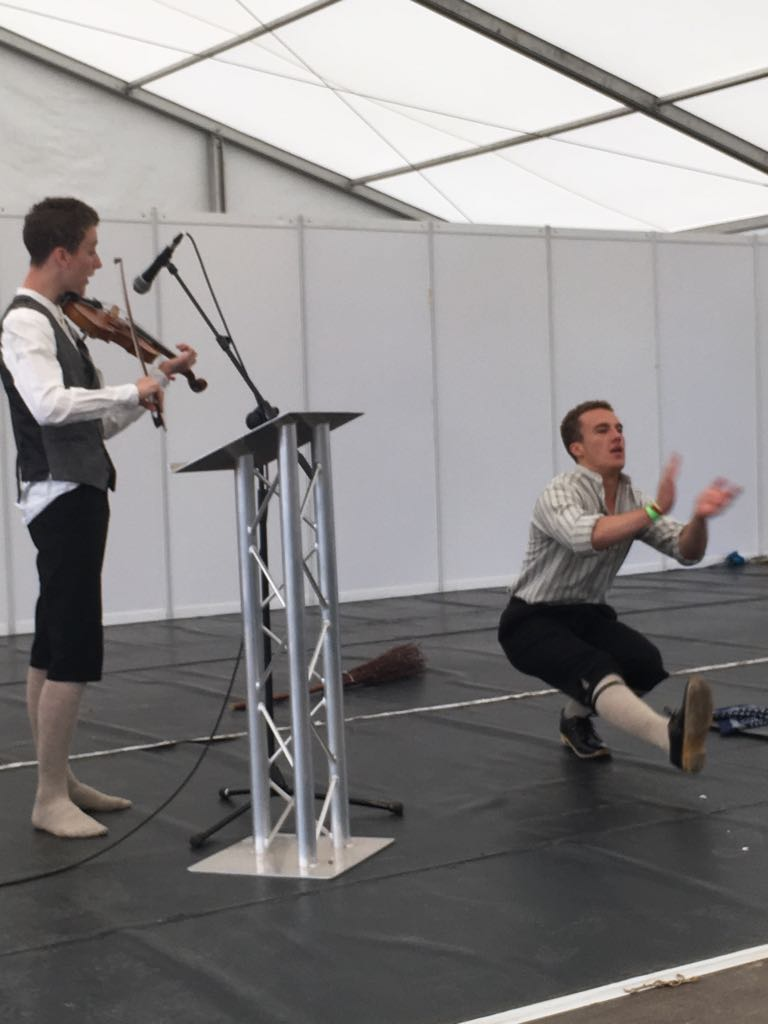
A Welsh clog dancer performing a "toby" at a preliminary solo competition of the 2017 National Eisteddfod in Bodedern.

==== Origin ====
Clog dancing in Wales originates mostly from slate quarries and farmers also. Workers would attempt to out-perform each other during work breaks by performing more extravagant and striking "steps" and "tricks" to impress their co-workers. The slate that was produced in the quarries could be used as a platform to clog dance and slate is still used even today in "eisteddfod" competitions.

==== Style ====
Welsh clog dancing is not a revival, as it is danced in the style of the unbroken tradition. Welsh clog dancing is stylistically distinct from English clog dancing with new steps and "tricks" constantly being invented as part of Eisteddfod competitions. For example, extinguishing a candle, toby stepping (propelling the feet forward alternatively in a squat position), straddle jumps, handkerchief jumps, stepping and jumping over brooms are performed.

==== Modern competition ====
Clog dancing is an integral part of both the local and national eisteddfod tradition in Wales. Competitions since the 1960s have extended to dancing duets and trios which meant that groups could recreate on stage the true tradition where one dancer was trying to out-dance the other. Group clogging has also become an integral part of the eisteddfodau and dancing tradition. Competition can be energetic with the dancers leaping over brooms as seen in the National Eisteddfod Male Welsh Clog Dancing Competition. Notable dancing groups include Natgarw Dancers hailing from the Pontypridd area and Talog dancers from Camarthern. Both groups have enjoyed significant success in National Eisteddfod competitions. Nantgarw dancers have also had significant success in international competitions such as the Llangollen International Eisteddfod in Wales, Lorient Folk Festival in France and Mallorca World Folk Festival in Spain.

== Dutch clog dancing ==
"Boerendansen" at the end of this news-clip from 1951

Klompendansen ('clog dancing'), sometimes Boerendansen ('farmer-dancing'), is a traditional style of folk dance from the Netherlands. The wooden klompen ('clogs') are used to create a rhythm by tapping the toes and heels on the floor, and are additionally worn as part of the traditional Dutch costume (klederdracht).

== Descendent traditions in the United States ==
In the United States, team clogging originated from square dance teams in Asheville, North Carolina's Mountain Dance and Folk Festival (1928), organised by Bascom Lamar Lunsford in the Appalachian region.

American clogging is associated with the predecessor to bluegrass—"old-time" music, which is based on fiddle tunes from the British Isles. Clogging developed from aspects of English, Welsh, German, and Cherokee step dances, as well as African rhythms and movement. It was from clogging that tap dance eventually evolved.

Solo dancing (outside the context of the big circle dance) is known in various places as buck dance, flatfooting, hoedown, jigging, sure-footing, and stepping. The names vary in meaning, and dancers do not always agree on their use.

Buck dancing was the earliest combination of the basic shuffle and tap steps performed to syncopated rhythms in which accents are placed not on the straight beat, as with the jigs, clogs, and other dances of European origin, but on the downbeat or offbeat, a style derived primarily from the rhythms of African tribal music.

Traditional Appalachian clogging is characterised by loose, often bent knees and a "drag-slide" motion of the foot across the floor, and is usually performed to old-time music.

== Miscellaneous clog dancing ==
=== Music hall ===
Clog dancers included Charlie Chaplin and Jack Wilson and Joe Keppel of Wilson, Keppel and Betty.

=== Ballet ===
The ballet La fille mal gardée contains a well-known clog dance.

== See also ==
- Step dance

== Citations ==
- Brady, Chris (2007), English Clogging in Lancashire in the 1800/1900s, Wigan Pier Experience Museum
- Britton, Eirlys (11 July 2011), dances
- Dobson, B. A. (1895), Humidity in Cotton Spinning, Bolton: G S Heaton. URL is text, facsimile at https://archive.org/stream/humidityincotton00dobs#page/n3/mode/2up
- English Folk Dance and Song Society (20 June 2014), Clog Dance, efdss
- Fisher, Alex (2003), Clog Dance – a brief history, ClogdanceUK!
- Karpeles, Maud (1930), The Lancashire Morris dance: containing a description of the Royton Morris dance, London: Novello for English Folk Dance Society also published in New York by H. W. Gray. "(accompanied by: tunes as pianoforte arrangements by Arnold Foster. Rush cart lads – The girl I left behind me – Corn rigs, or, Sawney was tall – Radstock jig – Balquhidder lasses – Shepton hornpipe – Nancy Dawson, or, Cross Morris)"
- Wallis, Lucy (11 December 2010), "Is clog dancing making a comeback?", BBC News
