= Toer van Schayk =

Dutch ballet dancer and artist

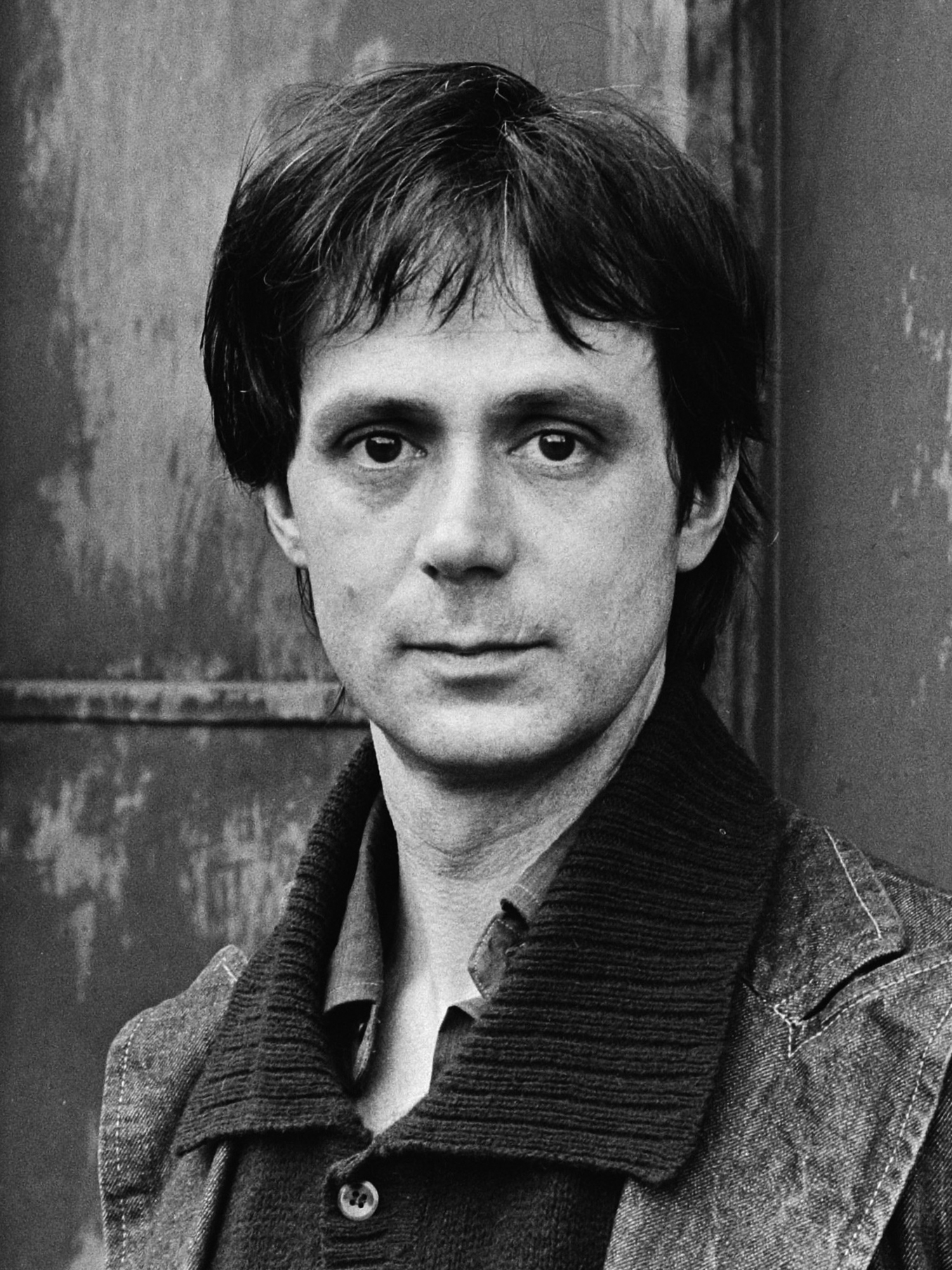
Toer van Schayk in 1979.

Toer van Schayk (born 28 September 1936) is a Dutch ballet dancer, choreographer, scenic and costume designer, painter, and sculptor. Along with Rudi van Dantzig and Hans van Manen, he is one of the creative triumvirate that brought the Dutch National Ballet to international prominence in the latter half of the twentieth century.

== Early life and training ==
Born in Amsterdam, Toer van Schayk (or Schaijk) began his ballet studies as a teenager, first with Irail Gadeskov and then with Sonia Gaskell, a former Ballets Russes dancer who ran a school and a small classical company in the city. She invited him to join her company, the Nederlands Ballet, in 1955, when he was 19 years old. A handsome young man and an expressive dancer, he remained with her troupe until 1959, when he interrupted his dancing career to study painting and sculpture at the Royal Academy of Art, The Hague.

== Theatrical career ==
In 1965, van Schayk returned to dance and joined Het National Ballet (Dutch National Ballet), which had been formed by the merger of the Nederlands Ballet and the Amsterdam Ballet, There, from 1965 to 1976, his eloquent and powerful interpretations led him to become one of the company's best-loved soloists. Among his most admired roles was the Young Boy in Monument voor een Gestorven Jongen (Monument for a Dead Boy), a ballet by Rudi van Dantzig set to music by Jan Boerman that concerned a homosexual youth who suffered prejudice because of his unorthodox sexuality. Van Schayk choreographed his own first work, Onvoltooid Verleden Tijd (Imperfect Past Tense), set to music by György Ligeti, in 1971. A few years later, in 1976, he joined van Dantzig and van Manen as a resident choreographer of the Dutch National Ballet and won an international reputation through some thirty works that he created for the company. He also became known as one of the foremost Dutch stage designers, particularly for his own ballets and those of van Dantzig. As a painter and sculptor, he has had exhibitions in Amsterdam, Athens, London, and New York.

Van Schayk's choreographic approach is very plastic, often combining dance and mime and using his dancers as moving sculptures. His ballets exhibit an affinity with those of van Dantzig, particularly in their use of both classical ballet and modern dance techniques. His emphasis on the expression of emotions is also similar to van Dantzig's, often enigmatic and anxious but less tormented and more elegiac, sometimes with an air of melancholy. Further, his dance images are more impressionistic, with a fluid, ethereal aspect and a distilled, linear movement of arms and legs that imbues his work with a certain quality suggestive of a sketchbook. In short, his choreographies are more sculptural and painterly than those of his colleague.

== Selected dance works ==
- 1971, Onvoltooid Verleden Tijd (Imperfect Past Tense), music by György Legeti.
- 1972. Voor, Tijdens en Na het Feest (Before, During, and After the Party), music by Gilius van Bergeijk. About a failure to communicate, marked by a dry, ironic sense of humor.
- 1973. The Art of Saying Bye-Bye, music by Henry Purcell.
- 1974. Pyrrhic Dances, music by Geoffrey Grey. The first of four ballets inspired by the martial dances of ancient Greece.
- 1975. Eight Madrigals, music by Carlo Gesualdo.
- 1975. Collective Symphony, with Hans van Manen and Rudi van Dantzig, music by Igor Stravinsky.
- 1976. Eerste Lugtige Plaatsing (First Aerial Position), music by Louis Spohr. A direct reference to the advent of the Romantic ballet in the 1830s, when ballerinas first rose, aerially, on pointe.
- 1977. Pyrrhic Dances II, music by Jean-Baptiste Lully, François Couperin, and others.
- 1977. Jeux, music by Claude Debussy. The first of two works inspired by ballets created by Vaslav Nijinsky for Sergei Diaghilev's Ballets Russes in the 1910s.
- 1978. Faun, music by Claude Debussy.
- 1979. Life, with Rudi van Dantzig, music by various composers. The theme is the oppression of liberty.
- 1980. Pyrrhic Dances III, music by Alban Berg.
- 1980. Chiaroscuro, music by Carlo Gesualdo and Jan van Vlijmen.
- 1980. Neglected Garden, music by Wolfgang Amadeus Mozart.
- 1982. Landschap (Landscape), music by various composers. A strong social focus on warfare and environmental pollution.
- 1983. Dodeneiland (Island of Death), music by Sergei Rachmaninoff.
- 1986. Seventh Symphony, music by Ludwig van Beethoven.
- 1987. Het Mythische Voorwensel (The Mythical Pretext), music by Béla Bartok,.
- 1990. Mozart Requiem, music by Wolfgang Amadeus Mozart.
- 1991. Pyrrhic Dances IV, music by Beat Furrer and Bruno Liberda.
- 1992. Stilleven wit Plein (Still Life with White Square), music by Arnold Schoenberg. Notable for movement language with a distinctively sculptural quality.
- 1994. De Omkeerbaarheid van Roest (The Reversibility of Rust), music by various composers.
- 1996. Nussknacker en Mousekonig (The Nutcracker and the Mouse King), with Wayne Eagling, music by Pyotr Ilyich Tchaikovsky. Set in Amsterdam on Saint Nicholas Day (6 December) around 1810. More dynamic and exciting and less sugary than most productions.
- 1999. De Toverfluit (The Magic Flute), with Wayne Eagling, music by Ricardo Drigo.

== Videography ==
- c.2003. The Dutch National Ballet. A trio of ballets, including Seventh Symphony. Music by Ludwig van Beethoven. Choreography by Toer van Schayk. A pure dance work for which van Schayk was awarded the 1987 Choreography Prize by the Association of Theater and Concert Hall Directors. Released on DVD by Arthaus Muzik.
- 2009. Giselle. Music by Adolphe Adam, with interpolations from other composers. Choreography by Marius Petipa, after Jean Coralli and Jules Perrot. Produced and with additional choreography by Rachel Beaujean and Ricardo Bustamente. Sets and costumes by Toer van Schayk. With Anna Tsygankova as Giselle, Jozef Varga as Albrecht, and Igone de Jongh as Myrtha. Dutch National Ballet, recorded live at the Amsterdam Muziktheater in February 2009. Released on DVD by Kultur International Films.
- 2011. Don Quichot. Music by Ludwig Minkus. Choreography by Alexei Ratmansky. Sets and costumes by Toer van Schayk. With Anna Tsygankova as Kitri, Matthew Golding as Basil, Peter de Jong as Don Quixote, and Karel Rooj as Sancho Panza. Dutch National Ballet, recorded in Amsterdam. Released on DVD by Arthaus Muzik in April 2011.
- 2012. The Nutcracker and the Mouse King. Music by Pyotr Ilyich Tchaikovsky. Choreography by Toer van Schayk and Wayne Eagling. Sets and costumes by Toer van Schayk. With Anna Tsygankova as Clara, Matthew Golding as the Prince, James Stout as the Nutcracker, Wolfgang Tietze as Mr. Drosselmeijer, and Alexander Zhembrovsky as the Mouse King. Dutch National Ballet, recorded in Amsterdam. Released on DVD by Arthaus Muzik in May 2012.

== Personal and later life ==
Toer van Schayk met Rudi van Dantzig when both were young men in Sonia Gaskell's company in the late 1950s. They formed a strong romantic union that lasted more than fifty years, until van Dantzig's death in 2012. As professionals, they were an extraordinary couple in the dance world, both talented and prolific choreographers and creative colleagues in mounting new works. Van Schayk designed sets and costumes for most of van Dantzig's many works as well as his own.

Although van Schayk retired in 2011, he continues to be active within Dutch National Ballet. He still rehearses his own ballets with the company and supervises his designs. He designed a new production of Sir Frederick Ashton's Cinderella for the Royal Ballet in London in 2003; he created the remarkable sets and costumes for the Dutch National's much-admired production of Giselle in 2009; and he designed the fairytale costumes for Wayne Eagling's production of The Sleeping Beauty for the National Ballet of Japan in 2014. He has since supervised the sets, costumes, and lighting in various ballet productions in the Netherlands, England, Poland, and Canada.
