= Polly Cuninghame =

Dutch ballerina

Marie Polly Cuninghame (ca. 1785, Bordeaux – 9 April 1837, De Bilt), known after her marriage as Polly de Heus, was a Dutch ballet dancer.

After ballet training in Bordeaux she danced briefly in Paris and Brussels. She was then contracted by the Stadsschouwburg Amsterdam, where she danced from 1801 until 1823, making this period a high point for ballet in Amsterdam.

In 1807 she married a widower and manufacturer 20 years her senior, Hendricus de Heus.
