= Stichting De Stilte =

Stichting De Stilte, or abbreviated De Stilte, is a Dutch dance company based in Breda focused on modern dance in combination with performing for children, but also for an adult audience.

De Stilte organizes performances as well as educational activities such as workshops, introductions and lessons. They run over 500 productions a year and is part of the basic infrastructure of the Dutch Ministry of Culture, Education and Science and receives a guaranteed structural funding for that. The organisation has two studios, one of it is a fully equipped theatre where they do public performances. Every two years the International Stiltefestival takes place in and around Breda. The organisation tours regularly worldwide, besides their activities in the Netherlands. In 2015 De Stilte was no.82 in the Dutch Cultuur Top 100 of NRC Handelsblad.
