= Klomp =

Type of clogs from the Netherlands

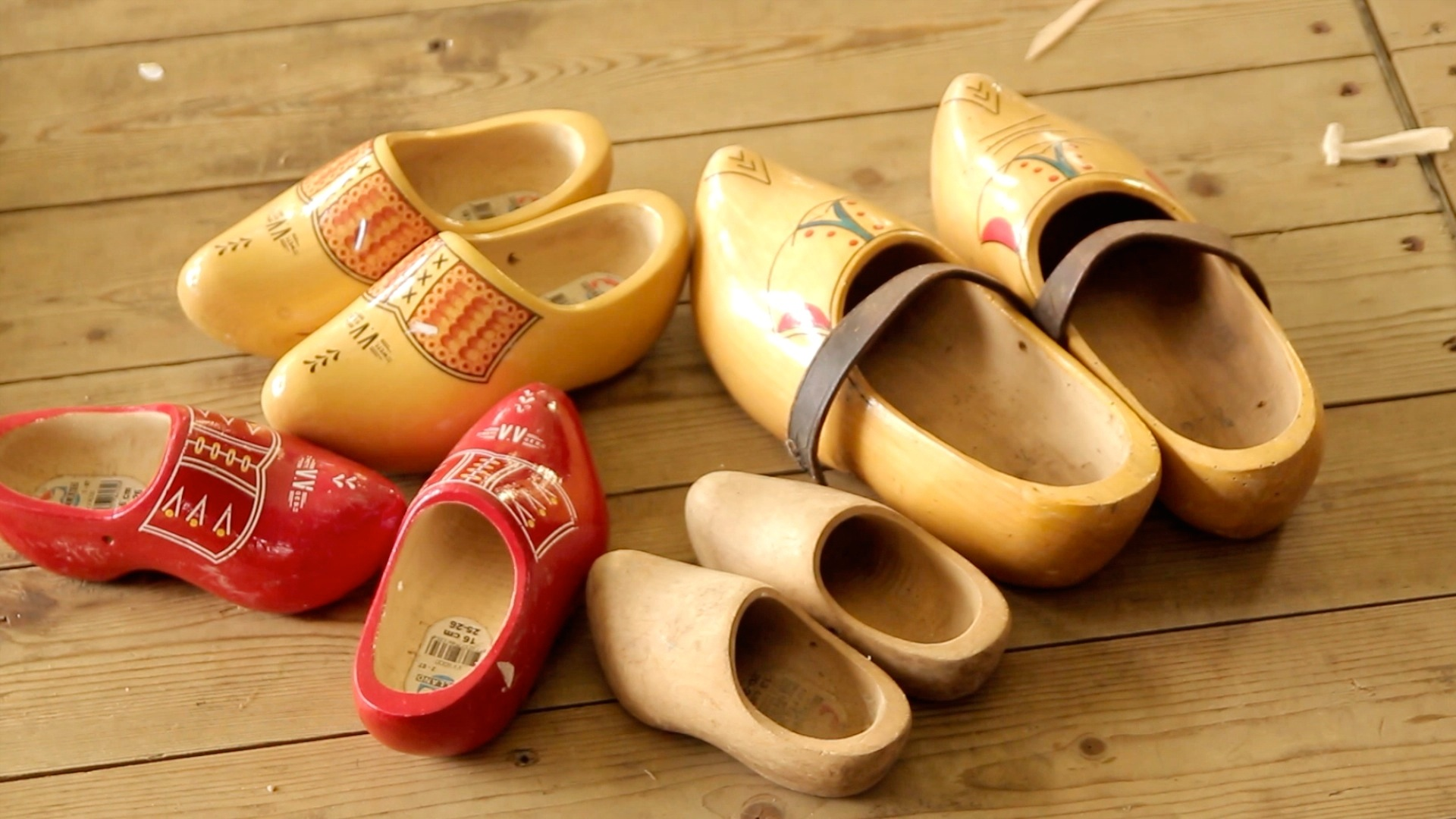
Dutch (poplar) clogs, for everyday use. The red painting on top makes the clogs look like leather shoes. It is a traditional motif on painted clogs.

A klomp (Dutch: [klɔmp], plural klompen [ˈklɔmpə(n)]) is a whole-foot clog from the Netherlands. Along with cheese, tulips, and windmills, they are strongly associated with the country and are considered to be a national symbol of the Netherlands.

== Usage ==
Approximately three million pairs of klompen are made each year. They are sold throughout the Netherlands. A large part of the market is for tourist souvenirs, though some Dutch people, particularly farmers and market gardeners, still wear them for everyday use. Outside the tourist industry, klompen can be found in local tool shops, local tourist shops and garden centers.

The traditional all-wooden Dutch clogs have been officially accredited as safety shoes with the CE mark and can withstand almost any penetration including sharp objects and concentrated acids. They are actually safer than steel-capped protective shoes in some circumstances, as the wood cracks rather than dents in extreme accidents, allowing easy removal of the clog and not continued pressure on the toes by the (edge of the) steel nose.

== Manufacture ==
Clogmaking

Klompen are manufactured by first selecting suitable wood, usually willow or poplar, and cutting the trunk into blocks. These blocks are split along the grain and paired to form matching shoes. The bark is removed and each block is roughly shaped into the outline of a clog, either by hand or using machines that copy a template. The inside is then carefully hollowed out to fit a foot. After this, the clogs are refined to the correct size and thickness and smoothed both inside and out. Following this, the shoes are left to dry, usually for several weeks, to prevent cracking. Finally, they are sanded and finished, and may be painted or decorated with traditional designs.

== See also ==
- List of shoe styles
- Bata Shoe Museum, Canada
- International Wooden Shoe Museum Eelde, Netherlands
- Klompendansen
