= Klompendansen =

Traditional folk dance on clogs from the Netherlands

"Boerendansen" at the end of this news-clip from 1951

Klompendansen ('clog dancing'), sometimes Boerendansen ('farmer-dancing'), is a traditional style of folk dance from the Netherlands. The wooden (klompen ('clogs') are used to create a rhythm by tapping the toes and heels on the floor, and are additionally worn as part of the traditional Dutch costume (klederdracht). These clogs are made lighter than the traditional 800-year-old klomp design. The soles are made from ash wood, and the top part is cut lower by the ankle.

== Modern performances ==
In 2006, nearly 500 teenagers attempted the "Guinness Book of World Records" bid for the largest number of clog dancers. It took place in The Hague. They were dancing the ballet version of the Dutch clog dance rather than the folk version.

The ballet La fille mal gardée contains a well-known clog dance. For this specific dance the choreography was created by Stanley Holden (1928–2007), though Frederick Ashton took overall responsibility for it.

== See also ==
- Dutch folk dance
- Clog dancing
- Clogging
