= Hans van Manen =

Dutch ballet dancer (1932–2025)

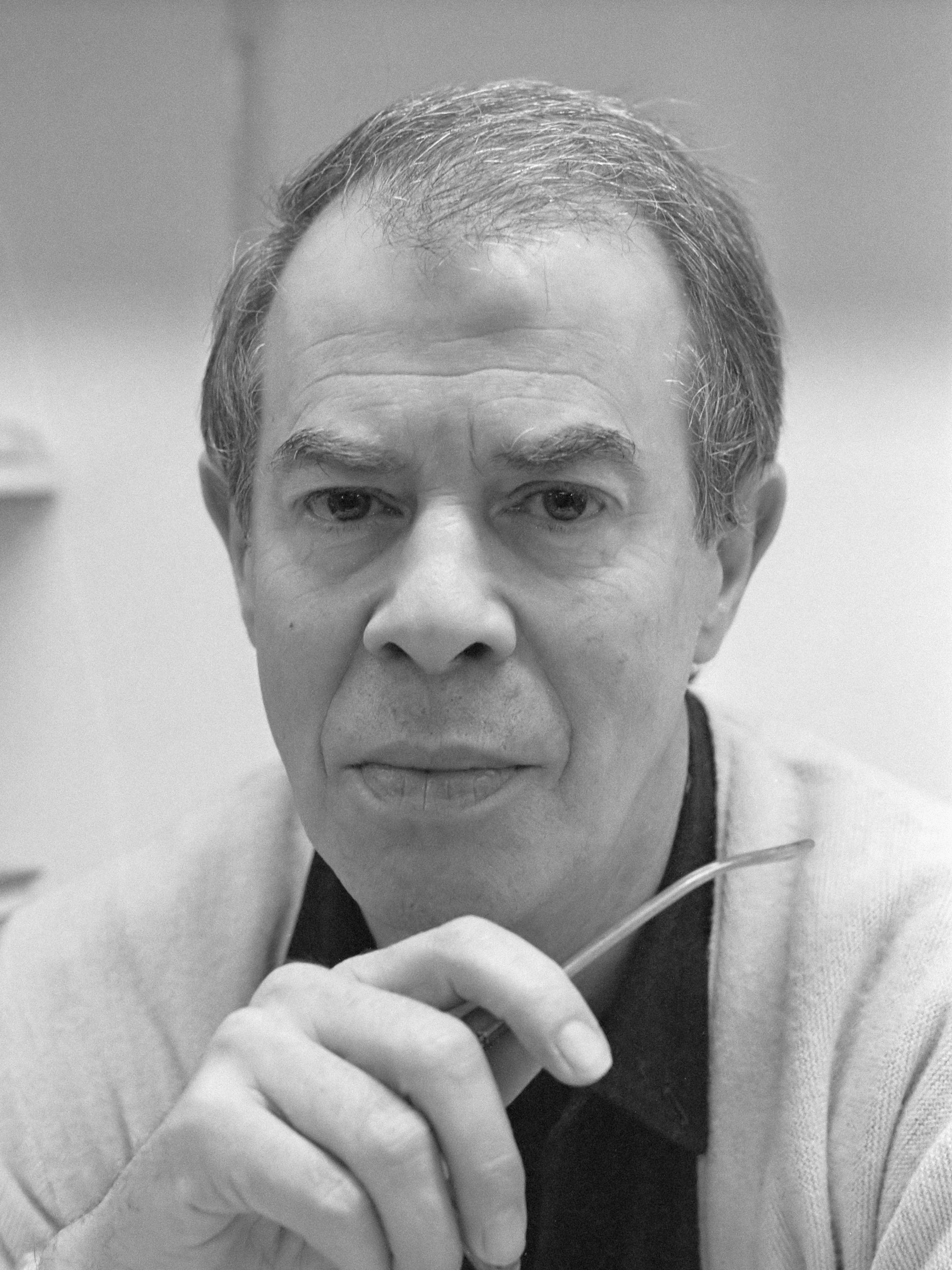
- Van Manen in 1986
- Born: Hans Arthur Gerard van Manen; 11 July 1932; Nieuwer-Amstel, Netherlands
- Died: 17 December 2025 (aged 93); Amsterdam, Netherlands
- Occupations: Ballet dancer; choreographer; photographer
- Organizations: Nederlands Dans Theater; Dutch National Ballet
- Spouse: Henk van Dijk (m. 1999)
- Awards: Order of Orange-Nassau; Deutscher Tanzpreis; Erasmus Prize; Prix Benois de la Danse; Commander of the Order of the Netherlands Lion

Hans Arthur Gerard van Manen (Dutch pronunciation: [ɦɑns ˈɑrtyːr ˈɣeːrɑrt fɑ ˈmaːnə(n)]; 11 July 1932 – 17 December 2025) was a Dutch ballet dancer, choreographer and photographer. He created around 150 ballets, many of them for the Nederlands Dans Theater and the Dutch National Ballet. His creations were driven by the music and collaborations with ballet dancers during rehearsals. They are in the repertoires of major international companies.

== Life and career ==
Van Manen was born in Nieuwer-Amstel (now called Amstelveen), a suburb of Amsterdam, on 11 July 1932, the son of Gustav Adolf van Manen (1904–1940) and his German wife Elisabeth Berthe Margarete (née Lilienthal), known as Marga. He grew up with an older brother Gustaaf Albert "Guus", who would become a jazz pianist; the family moved to Amsterdam in 1940. He trained to be a make-up artist with Herman Michels from 1945, winning a Dutch competition in 1948. In 1949, he began to study ballet with Sonia Gaskell. He was a dancer in Gaskell's troupe Ballet Recital from 1951 and moved to the Dutch National Ballet, the ballet of the Dutch National Opera, the next year, then directed by Françoise Adret. In 1955, he choreographed his first work, Olé, Olé, la Margarita, for a show by Ramses Shaffy. His second ballet was Swing, created for the Scapino Ballet. His third creation, Feestgericht, was in 1957 the first creation for the National Ballet; it achieved the State Award for Choreography. He danced with Roland Petit's troupe in Paris in 1959.

Van Manen was among the founding members of the Nederlands Dans Theater (NDT), calle a rebel group, and choreographed two ballets for them that year. He served as artistic director of the NDT from 1961 to 1970, and then worked freelance for a while. From 1974 to 1987, he was ballet master of the Dutch National Ballet.

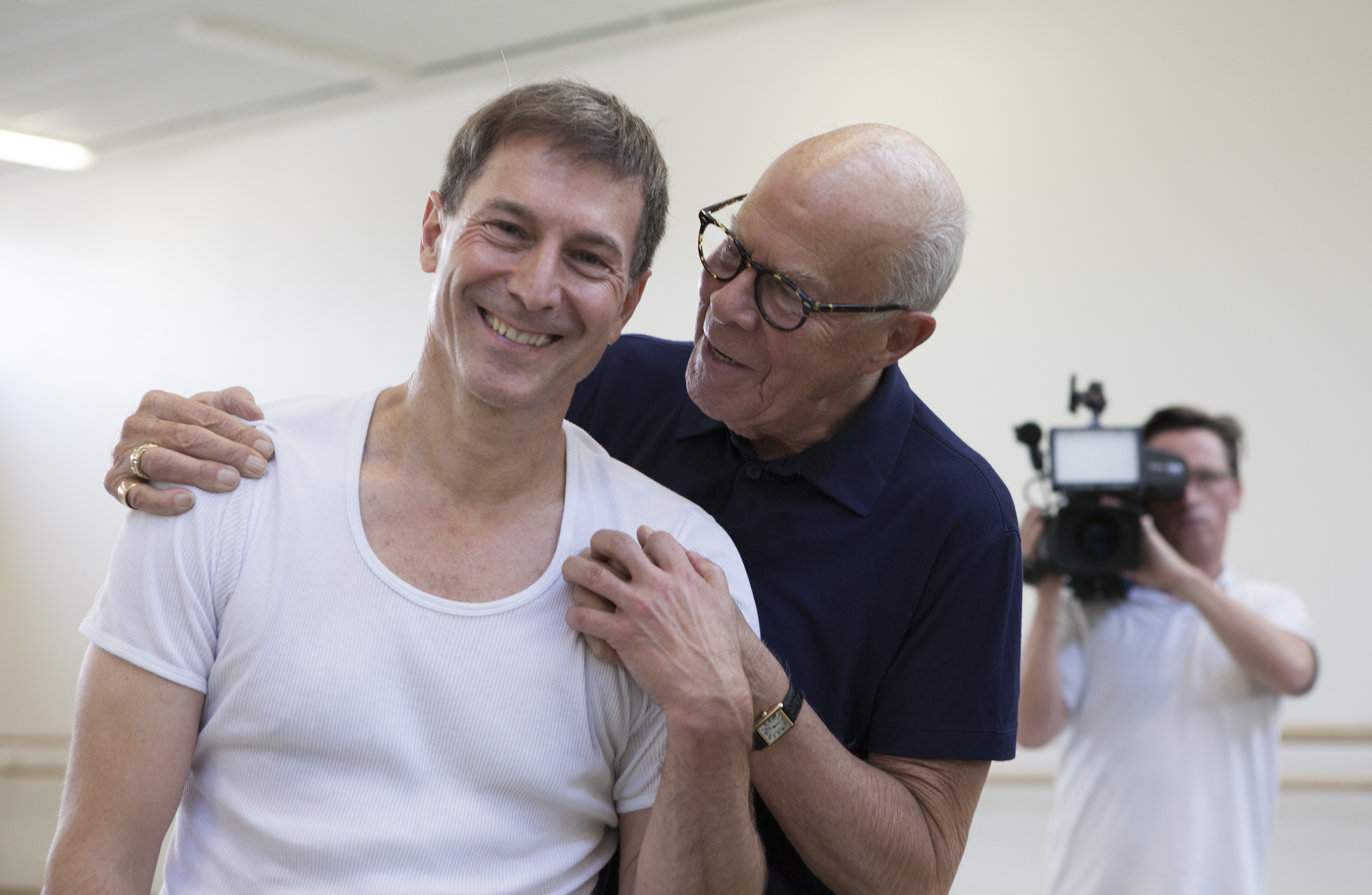
With Martin Schläpfer (left), working for a film

From 1988, Van Manen choreographed again mostly for the NDT. He created around 150 works, mostly short; for many he was also the designer of stage and costumes. Many international companies performed his creations, including the Alvin Ailey American Dance Theater, Berlin State Ballet, Birmingham Royal Ballet, Houston Ballet, National Ballet of Japan, Ballet de l'Opéra national de Paris, Philadelphia Ballet, San Francisco Ballet, Stuttgart Ballet, Vienna State Ballet, and Ballett Zürich. He credited the dancers' collaboration in rehearsal as his strongest inspiration. His most important sources of inspiration among Dutch dancers were Gérard Lemaître, Alexandra Radius, Han Ebbelaar, Sol León, Igone de Jongh and Olga Smirnova. He also worked with international dancers such as Anthony Dowell, Marcia Haydée, Natalia Makarova, Rudolf Nureyev, Ulyana Lopatkina and Diana Vishneva. Van Manen also worked as an art photographer.

While he created his last ballets in 2014, he oversaw his works until his death. He established the Hans van Manen Foundation in 2021, held by the Dutch National Ballet. It included custody of his works and responsibility for staging and distributing his choreographic works.

=== Personal life ===
Van Manen's longtime partner was Henk van Dijk, whom he met in the 1970s. They married in 1999. He was active in the Dutch gay rights movement.

Van Manen died in Amsterdam on 17 December 2025, at the age of 93.

== Awards ==
- Officer of the Order of Orange-Nassau (1992)
- Deutscher Tanzpreis (1993)
- Erasmus Prize (2000)
- Prix Benois de la Danse (2005) for lifetime achievement
- Musikpreis der Stadt Duisburg (2004) "for his brilliant musicality"
- Commander of the Order of the Netherlands Lion (2007)
- Commander of the Ordre des Arts et des Lettres (2017)
- Honorary Medal for Arts and Science of the Order of the House of Orange for his "enormous contribution to the arts in the Netherlands and to ballet in particular" (2018)

== Hans van Manen Festival ==
The Hans van Manen Festival was a dance festival staged by the Dutch National Ballet in Amsterdam in 2007 as a celebration of the 75th birthday of Hans van Manen. Joining the Dutch National Ballet were guest artists from the Bayerisches Staatsballet, the Kirov Ballet and Nederlands Dans Theater. Performing during the gala event were ballerinas such as Uliana Lopatkina, Lucia Lacarra, Igone de Jongh, among other. The event took place at the Het Muziektheater in Amsterdam.

== Ballets ==
Van Manen's approach was driven by the music, which he translated into movements as simple and clear as possible, integrating everyday movements and elements of social dancing. He danced the movements for the dancers.

Van Manen's ballets include:

- Olé, Olé, la Margarita (1955)
- Swing (1956)
- Feestgericht (1957)
- Mouvements Symphoniques (1958)
- De Maan in de Trapeze (1959, to music by Benjamin Britten)
- Klaar Af! (1960)
- Concertino (1961)
- Kaín en Abel (1961)
- Eurydice (1962)
- Voet bij Stuk (1962)
- Symphony in Three Movements (1963, to Stravinsky's Symphony in Three Movements)
- Omnibus (1964)
- Opus Twaalf (1964)
- Repetitie (1965)
- Essay in Stilte (1965)
- Metaforen (1965, to music by Daniel Lesur)
- Terugblik op Morgen (1966)
- Point of no Return (1966)
- Vijf Schetsen (1966, to music by Paul Hindemith's Five Movements for String Orchestra)
- Ready Made (1967)
- Dualis (1967)
- Untitled (1968)
- Variomatic (1968, to music by Lennox Berkeley)
- Three Pieces (1968)
- Solo for Voice 1 (1968)
- Squares (1969, to music by Z. Szilassy)
- Situation (1970)
- Mutations (1970)
- Snippers (1970)
- Twice (1970)
- Große Fuge (1971, to Beethoven's Große Fuge)
- Keep Going (1971)
- Ajakaboembie (1971)
- Tilt (1972)
- Twilight (1972)
- Opus Lemaitre (1972, to music by J. S. Bach)
- Daphnis en Chloë (1972, to music by Maurice Ravel)
- Septet extra (1973)
- Adagio Hammerklavier (1973)
- Assortimento (1973)
- Le Sacre du Printemps (1974, to Stravinsky's Le Sacre du Printemps)
- Kwintet (1974)
- Four Schumann Pieces (1975)
- Noble et Sentimentale (1975)
- Collective Symphony (with Rudi van Dantzig and Toer van Schayk 1975, to music by Stravinsky)
- Ebony Concerto en een Tango (1976)
- Octet Opus 20 (1977)
- Lieder ohne Worte (1977)
- 5 Tango's (1977, to music by Ástor Piazzolla)
- Unisono (1978)
- Dumbarton oaks (1978)
- Grand Trio (1978)
- Memories of the Body (1979)
- Live (1979)
- Concerto voor piano en blazers (1979)
- Einlage (1980)
- Pianovariaties I (1980, to music by Bach and Luigi Dallapiccola)
- Izzy M. (1980)
- Sarcasmen (1981, to music by Prokofiev)
- Five Short Stories (1982)
- Trois Gnossiennes (1982, to Satie's Gnossiennes)
- Pose (1982, to music by Claude Debussy)
- Portrait (1983)
- In and Out (1983)
- Exposed (1984, to music by Debussy)
- Bits and Pieces (1984)
- Nieuw programma (1985)
- Balletscènes (1985, to music by Stravinsky)
- In Korte Broek (1985)
- Corps (1985)
- In Concert (1986)
- Opening (1986)
- In the Future (1986)
- Face (video) (1987)
- Symphonieën der Nederlanden (1987)
- Izzy en Olly in een Hemelbed (1987)
- Clogs (1987)
- Flags (1987)
- Wet Desert (1987)
- Shaker Loops (1988, to music by John Adams)
- The Sound of Music (1988)
- Black Cake (1989)
- Brainstorm (1989)
- Visions fugitives (1990)
- Intermezzo voor musici en dansers (1990)
- Two (1990 to music by Ferruccio Busoni)
- Theme (1990)
- Andante (1991, to music by Mozart)
- Evergreens (1991)
- On the Move (1992)
- Shorthand – Six Stravinsky Pieces (1993)
- Fantasia (1993, to Busoni's adaptation of Bach)
- Different Partners (1993)
- Concertante (1994)
- Compositie (1994)
- Nacht (1994)
- Polish Pieces (1995)
- Déjà vu (1995)
- Kammerballet (1995)
- The Old Man and Me (1996)
- Kleines Requiem (1996)
- Solo (1997)
- Three pieces for HET (1997)
- Couple (1998)
- Zero Hour (1998)
- Short Cut (1999)
- Two Gold Variations (1999)
- Bach Pieces (2000)
- Trilogie (2000)
- Two Faces (2000)
- Andante Festivo (2001)
- Simple Things (2001)
- Monologue, Dialogue (2003)
- Sticky Piece (2003)
- Frank Bridge Variations (2005, to Britten's Variations on a Theme of Frank Bridge)
- Six Piano Pieces (2006)
- Dreaming About You (2006)
- Tears (2008) part of In Space
- Waterfront (2009)
- Without Words (2010)
- Variations for Two Couples (2012)
- Dances with Harp (2014)
- Alltag (2014)
