= Lyubov Yegorova (ballerina) =

Russian ballerina (1880–1972)

Lubov Yegorova
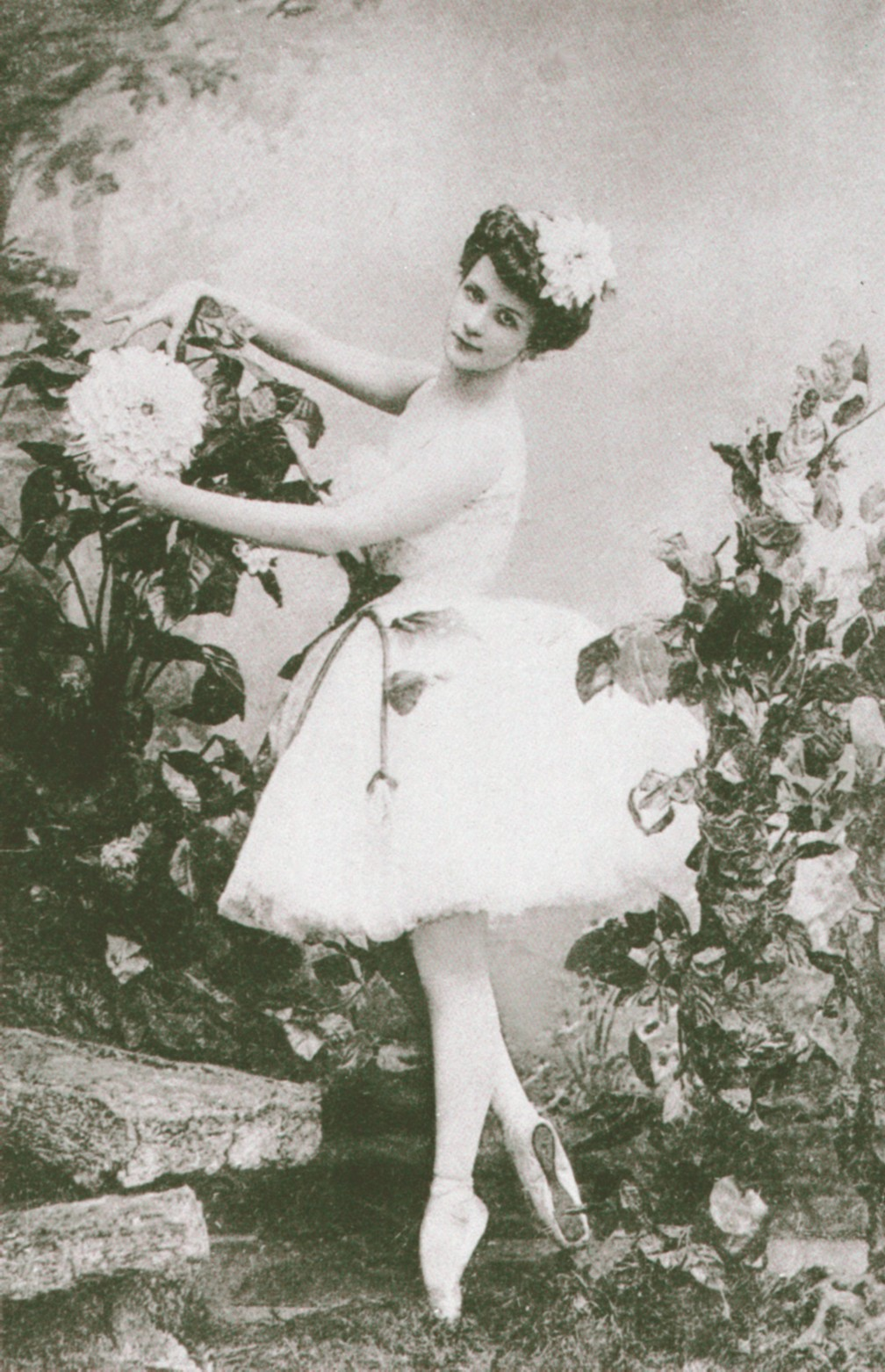
- Lubov Yegorova in the title role of the choreographer Marius Petipa's and the composer Cesare Pugni's ballet The Blue Dahlia, 1905
- Born: 8 August 1880; Saint Petersburg, Russia
- Died: 18 August 1972 (aged 92); Paris, France

Lubov Nikolayevna Yegorova (Russian: Любовь Николаевна Егорова; 8 August [O.S. 27 July] 1880 – 18 August 1972) was a Russian ballerina who danced with the Imperial Ballet and the Ballets Russes.

== Life and career ==
Lubov Yegorova was born in St. Petersburg, Russia. She studied ballet at the Imperial Theatre School in St. Petersburg with Ekaterina Vazem, Enrico Cecchetti and Anna Johansson. After graduating in 1898, she started work as a coryphée in the Imperial Ballet at Mariinsky Theatre and became a ballerina in 1914. A role as Myrtha in Giselle brought her to the attention of Sergei Diaghilev who cast her in the role of Princess Florine in The Sleeping Beauty in 1918, where she danced with Vaslav Nijinsky. She also went on to dance other roles with the Ballets Russes.

Yegorova's farewell performance in 1917 at the Mariinsky Theatre was in Swan Lake. However, she continued to dance, and in 1921 she interpreted the role of Aurora in Diaghilev's Sleeping Beauty production in London. After retiring from the stage, she taught as head of the Ballet Russe school in Paris from 1923 to 1968, and founded the Ballets de la Jeunesse company in 1937. She received the Chevalier de l'Ordre des arts et lettres in 1964. Notable students included Serge Lifar, Anton Dolin, Ethery Pagava, Yvonne Mounsey, Catherine Littlefield, Sonia Gaskell, and Zelda Fitzgerald, who described studying under "Madame" in 1925, in her novel Save Me the Waltz. Another of her students was Lucia Joyce, daughter of the Irish writer James Joyce.

== Personal life ==
In November 1917, Yegorova married Prince Nikita Sergeievitch Trubetzkoy (1877–1963), whose father was Director of the Hermitage Museum. Having lost her fortune through mismanagement, she died in a nursing home in Paris in 1972.
