= Rudi van Dantzig =

Dutch dancer and choreographer (1933–2012)

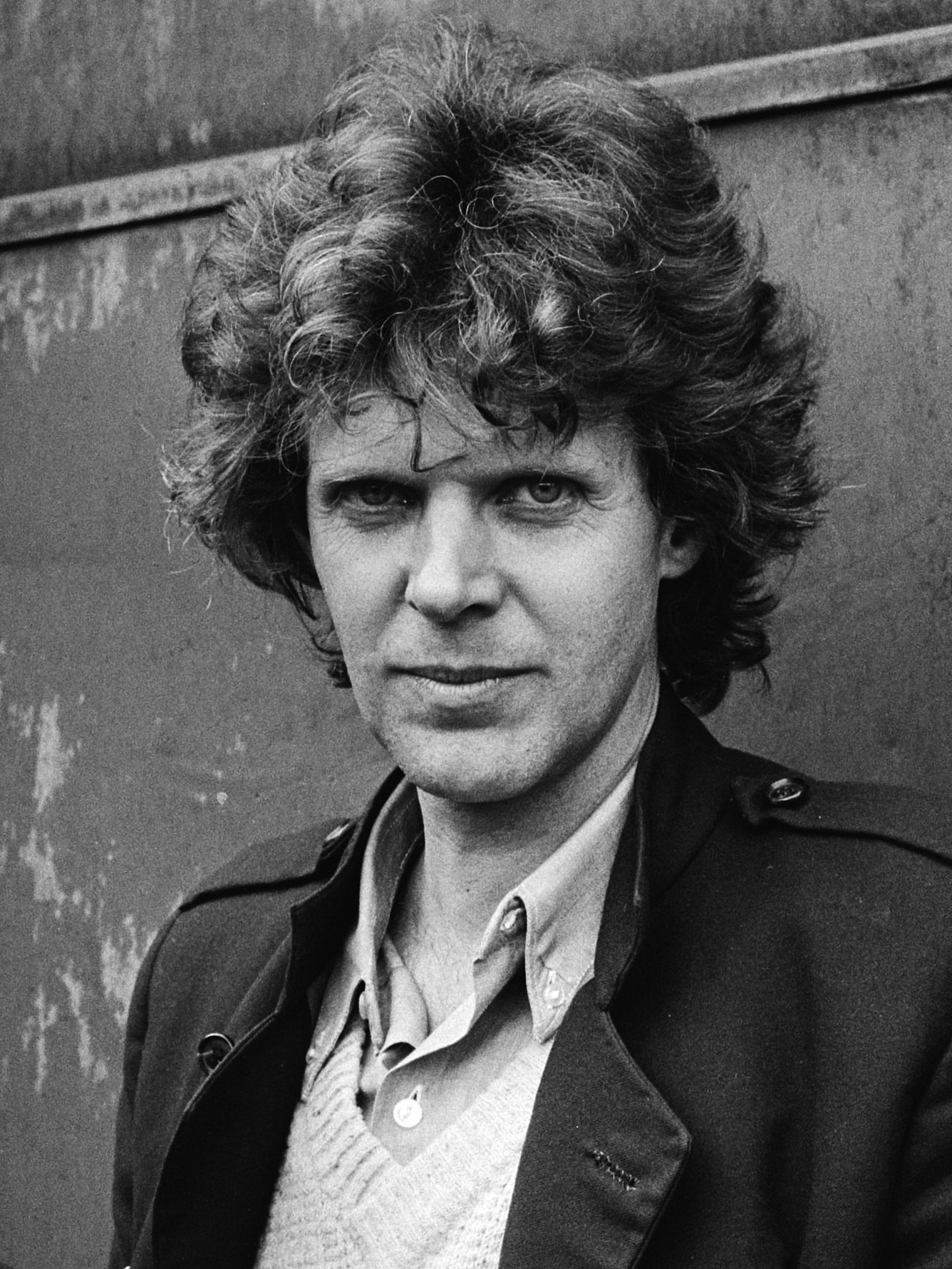
- Van Dantzig in 1979
- Born: 4 August 1933; Amsterdam, Netherlands
- Died: 19 January 2012 (aged 78); Amsterdam, Netherlands
- Occupations: Choreographer; company director; writer

Rudi van Dantzig (4 August 1933 – 19 January 2012) was a Dutch choreographer, company director, and writer. He was a pivotal figure in the rise to world renown of Dutch ballet in the latter half of the 20th century. He was co-director and then artistic director of the Dutch National Ballet from 1968 and 1991, and later did choreography for major companies, including Ballet Rambert, The Royal Ballet, the Royal Danish Ballet, American Ballet Theatre, and the Paris Opera Ballet.

== Early life and education ==
Rudi van Dantzig was born on 4 August 1933 in Amsterdam, where his father, Murk van Dantzig, worked in a Fokker aircraft factory. His parents held strongly left-wing views, espousing Marxism, advocating pacifism, and promoting Esperanto. He was six years old when the German army defeated Dutch forces in the Battle of the Netherlands in May 1940 and occupied the country at the beginning of World War II.

During the occupation of his homeland, young Rudi was sent to stay in a foster home in Friesland, where conditions were safer than in the city. During liberation of the Netherlands in May 1945, he met Walter, a young soldier in the First Canadian Army, which was largely responsible for the defeat of German forces in Holland. His friendship and love affair with this soldier – who was lost to him when he was suddenly transferred away – would provide the basis for his prizewinning later autobiographical novel Voor een Verloren Soldaat (For a Lost Soldier), published in the Netherlands in 1986 and later translated into English. The novel was also adapted for the 1992 drama film For a Lost Soldier. In the novel, the soldier is identified as Walter P. Narbutus.

Upon returning to school in Amsterdam, van Dantzig proved to be a poor scholar, uninterested in most of his schoolwork. When he wandered into a cinema showing The Red Shoes (1948), the ballet film by Michael Powell and Emeric Pressburger, his future path was decided. Inspired by viewing the film multiple times, he began taking ballet lessons at age 16 with Anna Sybranda and then with Sonia Gaskell, a former Ballets Russes dancer who ran a school and a small classical company in the city. There was a shortage of talented male dancers in postwar Europe, so, although he was not highly skilled, Gaskell engaged him in 1954 as a member of her company, Ballet Recital. He was tall, good looking, highly intelligent, and hard working, and he soon showed a gift for choreography. That same year, Martha Graham and her company paid their first visit to the Netherlands, and her technique and style had a profound effect on van Dantzig. Realizing new possibilities for drama and expressiveness in dance, he soon traveled to New York City to continue his training at her school.

== Career ==
Van Dantzig was among the dancers who founded the Netherlands Dance Theater in 1959, but in 1960 he returned to Gaskell's company, by then named Nederlands Ballet. After this company and the Amsterdam Ballet merged to become Het Nationale Ballet (Dutch National Ballet), van Dantzig filled a number of important positions. He became resident choreographer in 1961, a member of the artistic council in 1965, co-director in 1968, and sole artistic director in 1971. He remained in that post for two decades, until 1991. He had a talent for administration and a keen eye for importing and commissioning ballets that expanded the company's repertory and developed its dancers.

From the 1960s onward, van Dantzig choreographed more than 50 ballets, most of them on contemporary themes and most of them for his home company. Combining both classical and modern dance techniques, his ballets are expressionistic and fraught with symbolism, usually displaying psychological conflicts within a principal character. Basic themes are acceptance of life's imperfections and acceptance of death as the inevitable outcome of life's struggles. The former is central to his best-known work, Monument for a Dead Boy (1965), a portrait of an adolescent destroyed by his unacceptable sexuality. The latter is demonstrated in Four Last Songs (1977), an ensemble piece that is generally considered his best work. In it "he transformed Strauss's meditation on death into an understated love poem [in which] four couples are parted in duets by a sympathetic messenger of death."

Van Dantzig's unusual combination of classical ballet and modern dance technique in his choreography attracted the interest of Rudolf Nureyev, a famous Russian dancer with the Royal Ballet in London. Nureyev asked to be taught the principal role in Monument for a Dead Boy, which he eventually performed to acclaim for audiences in England and the United States, proving himself an accomplished modern dancer as well as a classicist. He and van Dantzig forged a strong friendship, and he subsequently returned to Amsterdam with commissions for two new ballets, Blown in a Gentle Wind (1975) and About a Dark House (1976). Van Dantzig's 1993 book Remembering Nureyev: The Trail of a Comet lovingly details their twenty-five years as friends and colleagues.

In 1991, van Dantzig left the Dutch National Ballet to concentrate on writing and mounting works for other companies. As a choreographer, he was in demand internationally as he mounted works for Ballet Rambert, the Harkness Ballet, The Royal Ballet, the Royal Danish Ballet, American Ballet Theatre, and the Paris Opera Ballet, among others.

== Personal life and death ==
As a homosexual with an active political sensibility, van Dantzig felt acutely the intolerance of his times, and this became a major theme in his ballets and his writings. He shared his life and career with his partner Toer van Schayk, a dancer, set and costume designer, and choreographer with the Dutch National Ballet.

Van Dantzig died in an Amsterdam hospital from lymphoma and male breast cancer on 19 January 2012, aged 78.

== Awards and honors ==
Among the awards and honors that van Dantzig received in his lifetime were the following.

- 1956. Choreography Prize (Amsterdam)
- 1961. Prix de la critique
- 1969. Knight of the Order of Orange-Nassau
- 1970. Choreography Prize (Amsterdam)
- 1982. Verdienstkreuz am Bande (Germany)
- 1985. Sonia Gaskell Award
- 1991. Officer of the Order of Orange-Nassau
- 2002. Lifetime Achievement Award (Prix Benois de la Danse)
- 2005. Silver Medal (Amsterdam)

== Selected dance works ==
- 1955. Nachteiland (Night Island), music by Claude Debussy.
- 1958. De Familiekring (The Family Circle), music by Béla Bartók.
- 1961. Jungle, music by Henk Badings.
- 1965. Monument voor een Gestorven Jongen (Monument for a Dead Boy), music by Jan Boerman.
- 1967. Romeo en Julia, music by Sergei Prokofiev.
- 1968. Ogenblikken (Moments), music by Anton Webern.
- 1969. Epitaff (Epitaph), music by György Ligeti.
- 1970. Onderweg (On the Way), music by Isang Yun.
- 1971. Geverfde Vogels (Painted Birds), music by Niccolò Castiglione plus a recording of the final chorale of Bach's St. Matthew Passion.
- 1973. Here Rests: A Summer Day, music by Franz Schubert.
- 1973. Ramifications, music by György Ligeti.
- 1975. Blown in a Gentle Wind, music by Richard Strauss.
- 1975. Collective Symphony, with Hans van Manen and Toer van Schayk, music by Igor Stravinsky.
- 1976. About a Dark House, music by Roman Haubenstock-Ramati.
- 1976. Romeo en Julia (second version), music by Sergei Prokofiev.
- 1977. Gesang der Jünglinge (Song of the Youths), music by Karlheinz Stockhausen.
- 1977. Vier Letzte Lieder (Four Last Songs), music by Richard Strauss.
- 1979. Life, with Toer van Schayk, music by various composers.
- 1980. Antwoord Gevend (Answering), music by Anton Webern.
- 1981. Onder Mijne Voeten (Under My Feet), music by Peter Schat.
- 1987. Buigen of Barsten (Bend or Break), music by Chiel Meijering.
- 1987. Sans Armes, Citoyens!, music by Hector Berlioz.
- 1988. Zwanenmeer (Swan Lake), music by Pyotr Ilyich Tchaikovsky.
- 1990. Aartsengelen Schlachten de Hemel Rood (Archangels Butcher the Heavens Red), music by Giya Kancheli.

== Selected writings ==
- 1974. "The Dutch Inheritance," in Ballet and Modern Dance, with Contributions by Leading Choreographers, Dancers, and Critics. London: Octopus Books, pp. 113–117.
- 1978. "A Question of Values," in Visions: Ballet and Its Future, edited by Michael Crabb. Toronto: Simon & Pierre.
- 1981. Olga de Haas: Een Herinnering (Olga de Haas: A Memory). Zutphen, Netherlands: Wahlberg Pers.
- 1982. "Clint Farha: The Dutch National's Wild Boy". Dance Magazine (New York), December 1982, pp. 52–55.
- 1986. Voor een Verloren Soldaat (autobiographical novel), translated by Arnold J. Pomeranz as For a Lost Soldier (London: Bodley Head, 1991). (Filmed in the Netherlands, with a screenplay by Roeland Kerbosch, Don Block, and Rudi van Dantzig, directed by Roeland Kerbosch, and released on DVD by Strand Releasing in 2002.)
- 1993. Remembering Nureyev: The Trail of a Comet, translated by Katie de Haan. Gainesville: University Press of Florida, 2008.
- 2003. Het Leven van Willem Arondéus, 1874–1943: Een documentaire (The Life of Willem Arondeus). Amsterdam: De Arbeiderspers.
- 2007. Life behind the Metaphor: Rudolf Nureyev and the Dutch National Ballet, with Rudolf Nureyev and photographs by Roger Urban. Lexington, Mass: Nureyev Legacy Project.
- 2012. Memories of Sonia Gaskell, published posthumously.

== See also ==
- Culture in Amsterdam
- Dance in the Netherlands
- List of choreographers
- List of dancers
- List of Dutch writers
- List of novelists
- List of people from Amsterdam
