= Henk Badings =

Dutch composer

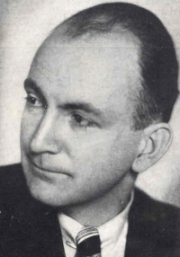
Henk Badings

Henk Badings (hĕngk bä'dĭngz) (17 January 1907 – 26 June 1987) was an Indonesian-Dutch composer.

== Early life ==
Born in Bandung, Java, Dutch East Indies, as the son of Herman Louis Johan Badings, an officer in the Dutch East Indies army, Hendrik Herman Badings became an orphan when he was seven years old. Having returned to the Netherlands in 1915, Badings took up violin and piano, however was dissuaded by his guardians from pursuing a career in music. Badings enrolled at the Delft Polytechnical Institute (later the Technical University), graduating in 1931. He worked as a mining engineer and palaeontologist at Delft until 1937, after which he dedicated his life entirely to music. (Note: Badings took up an interest in composing in 1930, becoming a student of Willem Pijper, and in 1934 he assumed the position as a teacher of theory and composition at the Rotterdam Conservatory) Though largely self-taught, he became a pupil of Willem Pijper, the doyen of Dutch composers at the time, but their musical views differed widely and after Pijper had attempted to discourage Badings from continuing as a composer, Badings broke off contact.

== Music career ==
In 1930 Badings had his initial big musical success when his first cello concerto (he eventually wrote a second) was performed at the Concertgebouw in Amsterdam. Champions of his work included such eminent conductors as Eduard van Beinum and Willem Mengelberg. He held numerous teaching positions; e.g., at the Musikhochschule Stuttgart and the University of Utrecht. Accused after the Second World War of collaboration with the Nazi occupation forces, in April 5, 1942 he was briefly cancelled from professional musical activity, but by June 3, 1947 he had been reinstated.

Badings used unusual musical scales and harmonies (e.g., the octatonic scale); he also used the harmonic series scale from the eighth to the fifteenth overtone. An exceptionally prolific artist, he had produced over a thousand pieces at the time of his death in Maarheeze in 1987.

Compositions by Badings include fifteen numbered symphonies, at least four string quartets, several concertos, other orchestral works including a "Symphonietta : speelmuziek voor klein symphonie-orkest", other chamber music works, piano works, and incidental music.

In the 21st century, interest in Badings' music has grown. The German label CPO has committed itself to recording Badings' entire orchestral œuvre, and a Badings Festival was held in Rotterdam during October 2007.

== Compositions ==
=== Orchestral ===
- Symphony No. 1 (for 16 solo instruments) (1932)
- Symphony No. 2 (1932)
- Symphony No. 3 (1934) (dedicated to Willem Mengelberg)
- Symphony No. 4 (1943)
- Symphony No. 5 (1949) (dedicated to the Concertgebouw)
- Symphony No. 6 Psalmensymphonie (1953)
- Symphonic Scherzo, for orchestra (1953)
- Symphony No. 7 Louisville (1954)
- Symphony No. 8 (1956)
- Symphonic Variations on a South African Theme (1960)
- Symphony No. 9 for string orchestra (1960)
- Symphony No. 10 (1961)
- Symphony No. 11 Sinfonia Giocosa (1964)
- Symphony No. 12 Symphonische Klangfiguren (1964)
- Pittsburgh Concerto for wind and brass (1965)
- Symphony No. 13 for wind instruments (1966)
- Symphony No. 14 Symphonic Triptych (1968)
- Symphonietta for small orchestra (1971)
- Concerto for Orchestra (1982)
- Symphony No. 15 Conflicts and Confluences for symphonic band (1983)

=== Concertante ===
- Piano Concerto (1940)
- Double Piano Concerto (1964)
- Violin Concerto No. 2 (1935)
- Violin Concerto No. 3 (1944)
- Violin Concerto No. 4 (1947)
- Double Violin Concerto No. 1 (1954)
- Double Violin Concerto No. 2 (1969)
- Concerto for Violin, Viola and orchestra (1965)
- Concerto for Viola and string orchestra (1965)
- Cello Concerto No. 1 (1930)
- Cello Concerto No. 2 (1939)
- Flute Concerto No. 1 (1956)
- Flute Concerto No. 2 for flute and wind instruments (1963)
- Concerto for Flute, Oboe, Clarinet and orchestra (1981)
- Concerto for Bassoon, Contrabassoon and wind orchestra (1964)
- Saxophone Concerto (1951)
- Concerto for Four Saxophones and Orchestra (1984)
- Concerto for Harp and small orchestra or wind orchestra (1967)
- Organ Concerto No. 1 (1952)
- Organ Concerto No. 2 (1966)
