= Sonia Gaskell =

Lithuanian-Dutch dancer and ballet director

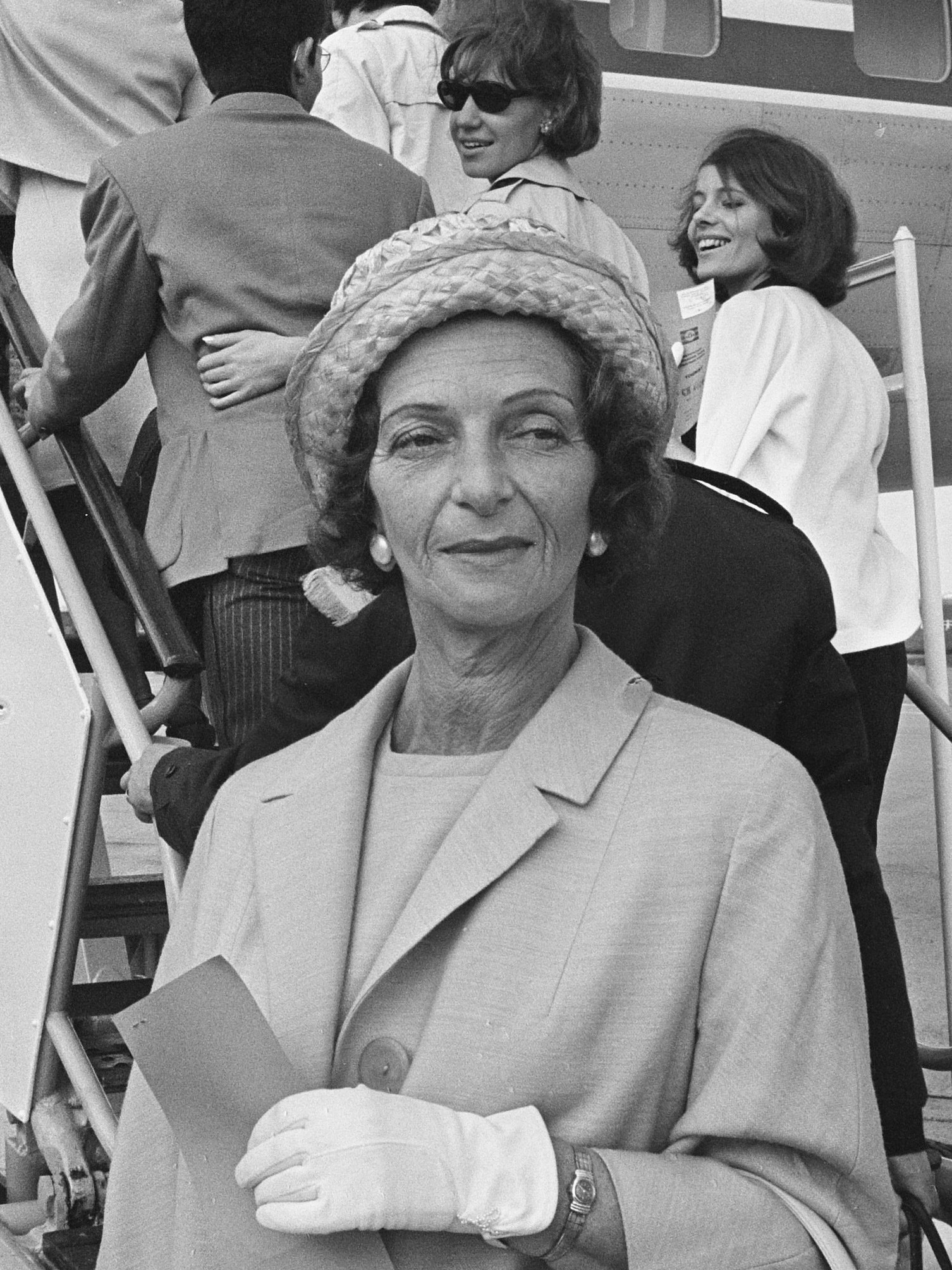
- Sonia Gaskell in 1964
- Born: 14 April 1904; Vilkaviškis, Lithuania
- Died: 9 July 1974 (aged 70); Paris, France
- Known for: Dancer; choreographer; Ballet and dance director; teacher

Sonia Gaskell (14 April 1904 – 9 July 1974) was a Lithuanian-Dutch-Jewish dancer, choreographer, dance teacher, ballet and dance director.

== Life and career ==
Sonia Gaskell was born in Vilkaviškis, Russian Empire (now located in Lithuania), to Russian Jewish parents. She first studied ballet in Kharkov, Ukraine. In 1921, she was sent to Palestine to escape Russian pogroms against the Jews. She relocated to Paris with her first husband in 1925, where she continued her ballet studies with Lyubov Yegorova and Léo Staats, and began dancing in nightclubs and touring cabaret shows during the 1930s.

Gaskell danced for the Ballets Russes from 1927–29 and Les Ballets de Paris where she served as director and choreographer until 1939, when she moved to Amsterdam with her Dutch husband. She worked as a dance teacher in Amsterdam, hiding from the Nazis during World War II, but still teaching. She established and served as director of companies including Ballet Recital, Ballet Studio '45 and the Netherlands Ballet. She was founder of the Netherlands Ballet Academy in The Hague, and served as artistic director of the Dutch National Ballet from 1961–68. Gaskell retired as director in 1969, and afterward served on the board of UNESCO and worked in TV productions. She died in Paris.

Gaskell's students included Audrey Hepburn and noted choreographers Hans van Manen and Rudi van Dantzig.

== Personal life ==
Gaskell married twice. About 1922 she married the mathematician Abraham Goldenson in Palestine, but the couple separated in 1939. She then married architect Philipp Heinrich Bauchhenss (1894–1948). She had no children.

== Legacy ==
In 2009, the Jewish Historical Museum and the Netherlands Theatre Institute presented an exhibition based on her life and work. The Sonia Gaskell Prize is awarded for excellence in choreography.
