= Kamensk-Uralsky constituency =

Kamensk-Uralsky single-member constituency
- Constituency of the Russian State Duma

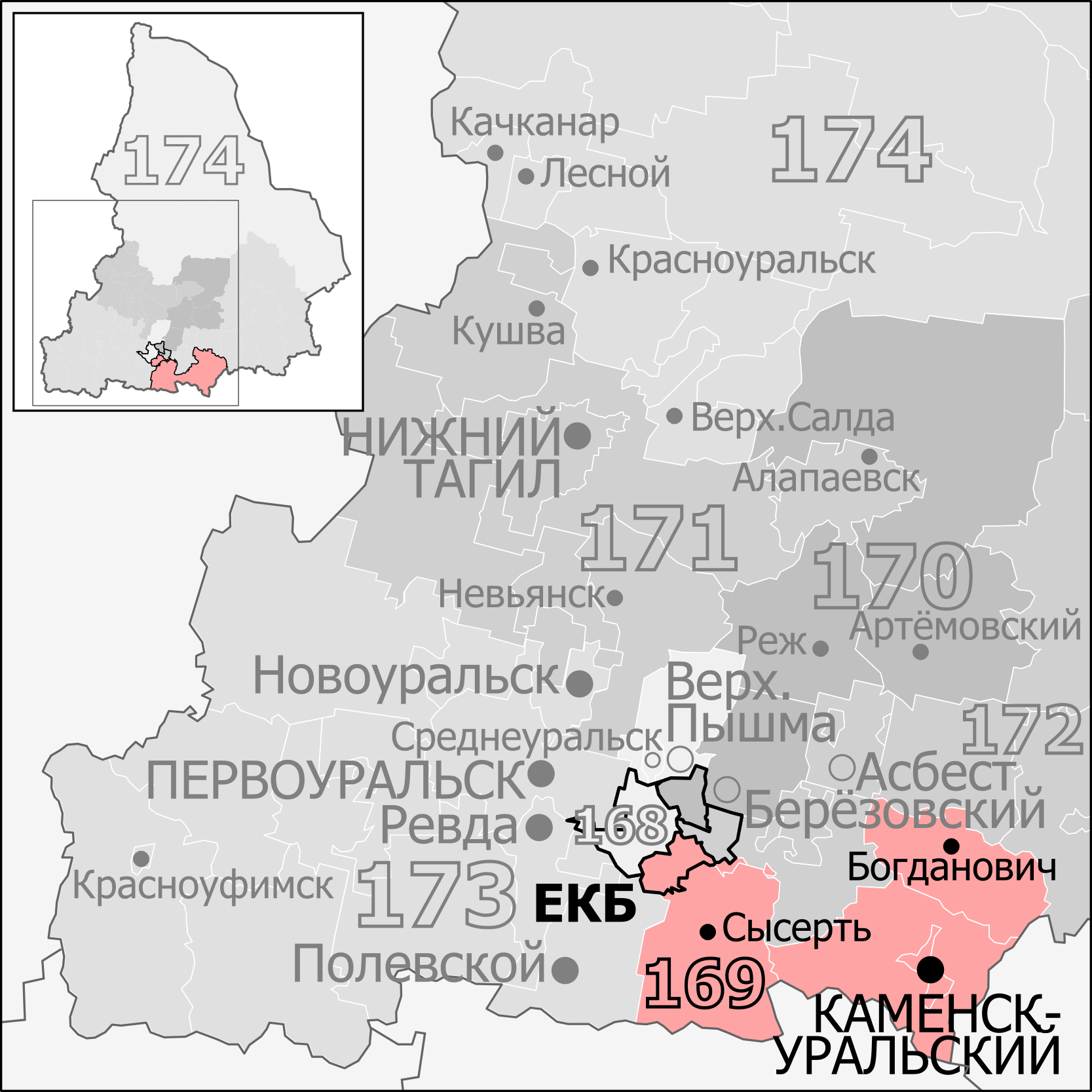
- Constituency boundaries since 2016
- Deputy: Lev Kovpak; United Russia
- Federal subject: Sverdlovsk Oblast
- Districts: Aramil, Bogdanovichsky, Kamensk-Uralsky, Kamensky, Sysertsky, ZATO Uralsky, Yekaterinburg (Chkalovsky)
- Voters: 475,017 (2026)

The Kamensk-Uralsky constituency (No.170 (Note: No.162 in 1993-1995, No.163 in 1995-2007, No.169 in 2016–2026)) is a Russian legislative constituency in Sverdlovsk Oblast. The constituency covers southern Sverdlovsk Oblast, including southern Yekaterinburg, industrial city Kamensk-Uralsky and towns Sysert and Bogdanovich.

The constituency has been represented since 2016 by United Russia deputy Lev Kovpak, former Member of Legislative Assembly of Sverdlovsk Oblast, supermarket chain owner and retail businessman.

== Boundaries ==
1993–2007: Aramil, Asbest, Beloyarsky District, Beryozovsky, Bogdanovichsky District, Kamensk-Uralsky, Kamensky District, Malysheva, Reftinsky, Sukhoy Log, Sysertsky District, Uralsky, Verkhneye Dubrovo, Zarechny
The constituency covered north-eastern, south-eastern and eastern suburbs and exurbs of Yekaterinburg as well as industrial areas to the east, including major metallurgy centre Kamensk-Uralsky, satellite city Beryozovsky, industrial towns Aramil, Bogdanovich, Sukhoy Log, mining town Asbest and Zarechny, where Beloyarsk Nuclear Power Plant is located.

2016–present: Aramil, Bogdanovichsky District, Kamensk-Uralsky, Kamensky District, Sysertsky District, Uralsky, Yekaterinburg (Chkalovsky)
The constituency was re-created for the 2016 election and retained only its southern part (Kamensk-Uralsky, Bogdanovich and Sysert), losing Asbest, Sukhoy Log and Zarechny to Asbest constituency, Beryozovsky – to Beryozovsky constituency. This seat was instead pushed into urban Yekaterinburg, gaining Chkalovsky City District from Verkh-Isetsky constituency.

== Members elected ==
Election	Member	Party
1993	Sergey Mikheyev	Independent
1995	Malik Gaisin	Independent
1999	Georgy Leontyev	Independent
2003	Georgy Leontyev	People's Party
2007	Proportional representation - no election by constituency	
2011	Proportional representation - no election by constituency	
2016	Lev Kovpak	United Russia
2021	Lev Kovpak	United Russia
2026	Lev Kovpak	United Russia

== Election results ==
=== 1993 ===
Summary of the 12 December 1993 Russian legislative election in the Kamensk-Uralsky constituency
Candidate	Party	Votes	%
Sergey Mikheyev	Independent	64,634	27.46%
Viktor Yakimov	Independent	–	23.42%
Pavel Dudorov	Kedr	–	–
Total		235,350	100%

=== 1995 ===
Summary of the 17 December 1995 Russian legislative election in the Kamensk-Uralsky constituency
Candidate	Party	Votes	%
Malik Gaisin	Independent	55,731	21.68%
Viktor Yakimov	Transformation of the Fatherland	38,269	14.88%
Sergey Mikheyev (incumbent)	Independent	38,173	14.85%
Sergey Izmodenov	Independent	24,222	9.42%
Lyudmila Gayday	Forward, Russia!	15,542	6.04%
Pavel Dudorov	Kedr	13,595	5.29%
Sergey Bukhovtsev	Liberal Democratic Party	11,382	4.43%
Aleksandr Rozhuk	Independent	9,339	3.63%
Azat Mukhametzyanov	Independent	7,860	3.06%
Valeria Chermeninova	Independent	7,191	2.80%
against all		30,644	11.92%
Total		257,107	100%

=== 1999 ===
Summary of the 19 December 1999 Russian legislative election in the Kamensk-Uralsky constituency
Candidate	Party	Votes	%
Georgy Leontyev	Independent	96,110	39.21%
Malik Gaisin (incumbent)	Independent	33,819	13.80%
Grigory Kasperovich	Independent	18,710	7.63%
Yury Raptanov	Independent	14,094	5.75%
Galina Shcherbakova	Women of Russia	10,508	4.29%
Pavel Putin	Independent	10,060	4.10%
Sergey Martyushov	Yabloko	9,748	3.98%
Sergey Mikheyev	Fatherland – All Russia	6,070	2.48%
Pavel Sverak	Party of Pensioners	4,139	1.69%
Ilya Zatsarinny	Spiritual Heritage	1,120	0.46%
Artyom Satovsky	Russian Socialist Party	904	0.37%
against all		35,044	14.30%
Total		245,093	100%

=== 2003 ===
Summary of the 7 December 2003 Russian legislative election in the Kamensk-Uralsky constituency
Candidate	Party	Votes	%
Georgy Leontyev (incumbent)	People's Party	73,083	32.405%
Aleksandr Ryavkin	Independent	73,078	32.403%
Konstantin Tsybko	Independent	21,972	9.74%
Yury Tsybakin	United Russia	14,430	6.40%
Lyudmila Yelizarova	Communist Party	9,867	4.38%
Aleksandr Leontyev	Independent	7,849	3.48%
Andrey Misyura	Independent	895	0.40%
against all		21,651	9.60%
Total		225,529	100%

=== 2016 ===
Summary of the 18 September 2016 Russian legislative election in the Kamensk-Uralsky constituency
Candidate	Party	Votes	%
Lev Kovpak	United Russia	69,066	37.51%
Yury Zlydnikov	A Just Russia	27,158	14.75%
Konstantin Subbotin	Liberal Democratic Party	18,559	10.08%
Aleksey Parfenov	Communist Party	17,331	9.41%
Vladimir Gerasimenko	Party of Growth	8,694	4.72%
Dmitry Golovin	Yabloko	8,599	4.67%
Konstantin Karashevich	Communists of Russia	7,205	3.91%
Valery Ivanov	Rodina	6,816	3.70%
Sergey Pakulov	The Greens	3,773	2.05%
Lev Iofe	Patriots of Russia	2,736	1.49%
Anatoly Koromyslov	People's Freedom Party	2,409	1.31%
Total		184,141	100%

=== 2021 ===
Summary of the 17-19 September 2021 Russian legislative election in the Kamensk-Uralsky constituency
Candidate	Party	Votes	%
Lev Kovpak (incumbent)	United Russia	65,497	30.10%
Andrey Gorislavtsev	A Just Russia — For Truth	47,177	21.68%
Aleksandr Ivachyov	Communist Party	40,110	18.43%
Stanislav Masorov	New People	13,115	6.03%
Aleksandr Kaptyug	Liberal Democratic Party	10,510	4.83%
Vladimir Taskayev	Party of Pensioners	10,252	4.71%
Nikolay Gavrilov	Yabloko	6,664	3.06%
Andrey Merkulov	Rodina	5,544	2.55%
Andrey Khabarov	Russian Party of Freedom and Justice	5,055	2.32%
Total		217,599	100%

=== 2026 ===
Summary of the 18-20 September 2026 Russian legislative election in the Kamensk-Uralsky constituency
Candidate	Party	Votes	%
Lev Kovpak (incumbent)	United Russia	71,554	34.64%
Oleg Gordeyev	Communist Party	45,670	22.11%
Lyubov Kuntsevich	New People	33,765	16.34%
Dmitry Bondarev	A Just Russia	28,017	13.56%
Yevgeny Kolomytsev	Liberal Democratic Party	19,624	9.50%
Total		206,585	100%
