= Beryozovsky constituency =

Beryozovsky single-member constituency
- Constituency of the Russian State Duma
- Deputy: Vladimir Smirnov; United Russia
- Federal subject: Sverdlovsk Oblast
- Districts: Artyomovsky, Beryozovsky, Rezhevsky, Yekaterinburg (Kirovsky, Ordzhonikidzevsky)
- Voters: 482,369 (2026)

The Beryozovsky constituency (No.171 (Note: Ordzhonikidzevsky constituency No.164 in 1993-1995, Ordzhonikidzevsky constituency No.165 in 1995-2007, No.170 in 2016–2026)) is a Russian legislative constituency in Sverdlovsk Oblast. The constituency covers north-eastern Yekaterinburg, its suburbs and satellite city Beryozovsky and stretches to central Sverdlovsk Oblast.

The constituency has been represented since 2026 by United Russia deputy Vladimir Smirnov, former Member of Legislative Assembly of Sverdlovsk Oblast and retail businessman, who won the open seat left vacant following the death of two-term United Russia deputy Sergey Chepikov in September 2026.

== Boundaries ==
1993–2003 Ordzhonikidzevsky constituency: Yekaterinburg (Kirovsky, Ordzhonikidzevsky, Zheleznodorozhny)
The constituency was based entirely within Yekaterinburg, covering northern half of the city.

2003–2007 Ordzhonikidzevsky constituency: Yekaterinburg (Kirovsky, Ordzhonikidzevsky, Zheleznodorozhny, Siniye Kamni microdistrict of Oktyabrsky)
The constituency was slightly altered following the 2003 redistricting, gaining the Siniye Kamni microdistrict in Oktyabrsky City District from Verkh-Isetsky constituency.

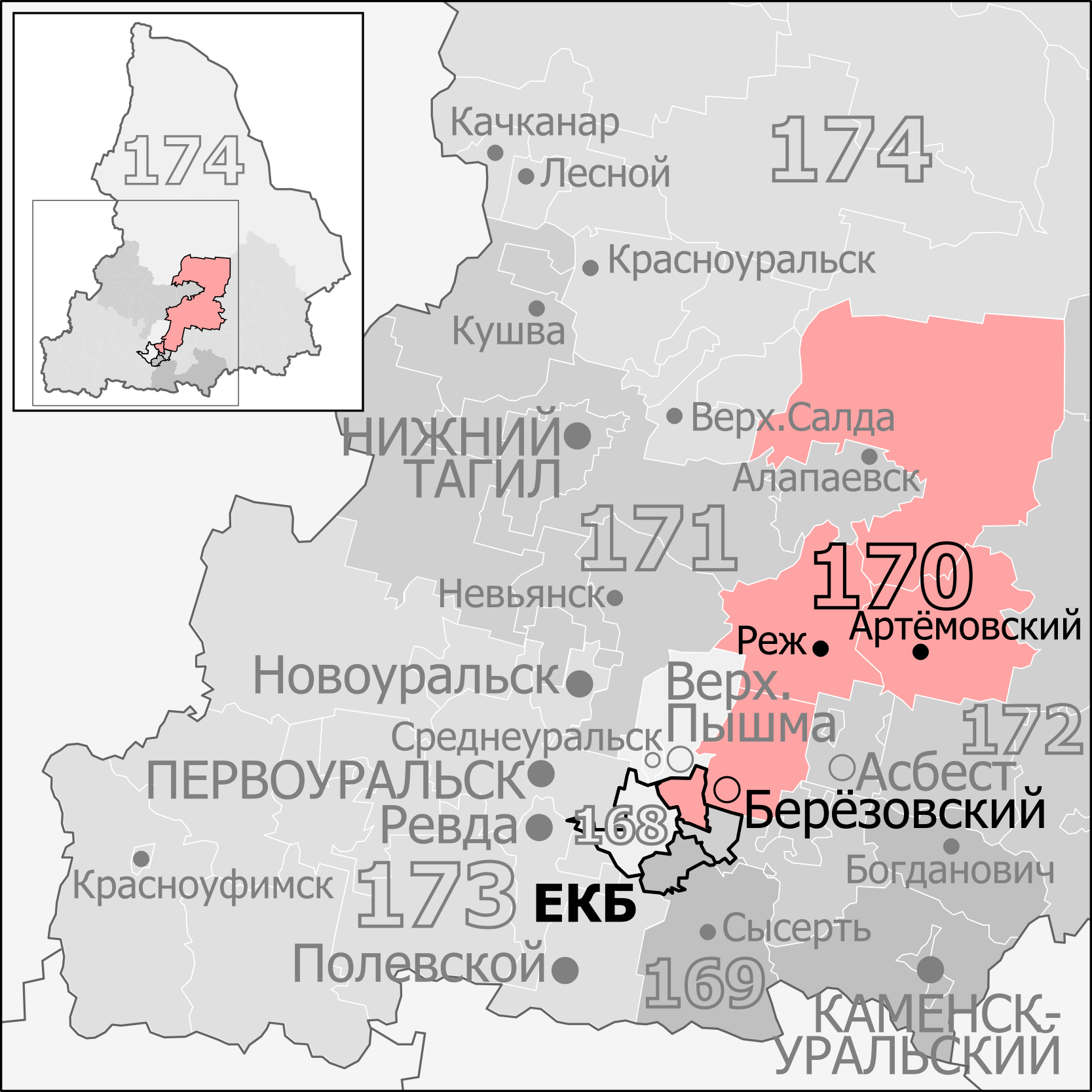
Constituency boundaries from 2016 to 2026

2016–2026: Alapayevsky District, Artyomovsky District, Beryozovsky, Rezhevsky District, Yekaterinburg (Kirovsky, Ordzhonikidzevsky)
The constituency was re-created for the 2016 election under the name "Beryozovsky constituency" and retained only Kirovsky and Ordzhonikidzevsky city districts of Yekaterinburg, losing Zheleznodorozhny City District to Sverdlovsk constituency. This seat instead gained satellite city Beryozovsky from Kamensk-Uralsky constituency as well as central Sverdlovsk Oblast from the former Artyomovsky constituency.

2026–present: Artyomovsky District, Beryozovsky, Rezhevsky District, Yekaterinburg (Kirovsky, Ordzhonikidzevsky)
After the 2025 redistricting the constituency was slightly changed, losing Alapayevsky District to Serov constituency.

== Members elected ==
| Election | Member | Party |
|---|---|---|
| 1993 | Yury Brusnitsyn (Note: appointed Deputy Chief of the State Duma Property Management Department in February 1995) | Independent |
| 1995 | Galina Karelova (Note: appointed Deputy Minister of Labour and Social Protection in May 1997) | Independent |
| 1998 | Dmitry Golovanov | Independent |
| 1999 | A by-election was scheduled after Against all line received the most votes | |
| 2000 | Nikolay Ovchinnikov (Note: appointed Chief of the Main Directorate for Combating Organised Crime of the Ministry of Internal Affairs) | Independent |
| 2003 | Yevgeny Roizman | Independent |
| 2007 | Proportional representation - no election by constituency | |
| 2011 | Proportional representation - no election by constituency | |
| 2016 | Sergey Chepikov (Note: died in September 2026) | United Russia |
| 2021 | Sergey Chepikov | United Russia |
| 2026 | Vladimir Smirnov | United Russia |

== Election results ==
=== 1993 ===
Summary of the 12 December 1993 Russian legislative election in the Ordzhonikidzevsky constituency
| Candidate | Party | Votes | % |
|---|---|---|---|
| Yury Brusnitsyn | Independent | 36,739 | 16.78% |
| Vladimir Isakov | Independent | 32,698 | 14.94% |
| Sergey Cherkasov | Independent | 31,374 | 14.33% |
| Sergey Martyushov | Independent | 23,714 | 10.83% |
| Mikhail Borisov | Independent | 15,800 | 7.22% |
| against all | | 62,469 | 28.54% |
| Total | | 218,898 | 100% |

=== 1995 by-election ===
After Yury Brusnitsyn resigned to take a job in the State Duma Apparatus a by-election in Ordzhonikidzevsky constituency was scheduled for 28 May 1995. The results of the by-election were annulled due to low turnout (10%).

==== Declared candidates ====
- Vladimir Lebedev, leader of the Sverdlovsk union of Soviet Afghan War veterans
- Nyazip Sarvarov, leader of the Russian Communist Workers Party in Sverdlovsk Oblast
- Aleksandr Shkolnik, journalist from Moscow

==== Results ====
Summary of the 28 May 1995 by-election in the Ordzhonikidzevsky constituency
| Candidate | Party | Votes | % |
|---|---|---|---|
| Aleksandr Shkolnik | Independent | 17,930 | 42.24% |
| Nyazip Sarvarov | Independent | 8,839 | 20.83% |
| Vladimir Lebedev | Independent | 4,814 | 11.34% |
| against all | | 7,756 | 18.27% |
| Total | | 42,444 | 100% |

=== 1995 ===
Summary of the 17 December 1995 Russian legislative election in the Verkh-Isetsky constituency
| Candidate | Party | Votes | % |
|---|---|---|---|
| Galina Karelova | Independent | 59,718 | 25.01% |
| Artyom Bikov | Independent | 26,796 | 11.22% |
| Anatoly Grebyonkin | Democratic Choice of Russia – United Democrats | 24,168 | 10.12% |
| Aleksandr Ponomarev | Our Home – Russia | 23,664 | 9.91% |
| Georgy Stepanenko | Russian Lawyers' Association | 10,901 | 4.56% |
| Nyazip Sarvarov | Communists and Working Russia - for the Soviet Union | 10,859 | 4.55% |
| Yakov Ryabov | Ivan Rybkin Bloc | 7,687 | 3.22% |
| Valery Bulatov | Liberal Democratic Party | 7,210 | 3.02% |
| Aleksandr Shlyapin | Forward, Russia! | 7,159 | 3.00% |
| Aleksandr Sivkov | Transformation of the Fatherland | 5,257 | 2.20% |
| Nafik Famiyev | Stanislav Govorukhin Bloc | 4,893 | 2.05% |
| Leonid Khabarov | Independent | 4,260 | 1.78% |
| Yury Andreyev | Independent | 2,929 | 1.23% |
| Oleg Lekhov | Independent | 1,873 | 0.78% |
| Aleksandr Aulov | Independent | 1,267 | 0.53% |
| Rudolf Sventsitsky | Independent | 1,232 | 0.52% |
| Anatoly Saulyak | Independent | 953 | 0.40% |
| against all | | 30,675 | 12.84% |
| Total | | 238,809 | 100% |

=== 1997 ===
After Galina Karelova was appointed Deputy Minister of Labour and Social Protection in May 1997 a by-election in Ordzhonikidzevsky constituency was scheduled for 23 November 1997. Aleksandr Khabarov, businessman and key member of the Uralmash gang, received the most votes in the by-election, however, the results were annulled due to low turnout (21%).

Summary of the 23 November 1997 by-election in the Ordzhonikidzevsky constituency
| Candidate | Party | Votes | % |
|---|---|---|---|
| Aleksandr Khabarov | Independent | 37,033 | 36.65% |
| Valery Terletsky | Independent | 9,634 | 9.54% |
| Aleksandr Tizyakov | Independent | 9,611 | 9.51% |
| Dmitry Golovanov | Independent | 6,955 | 6.88% |
| Vladimir Shchukin | Independent | 6,197 | 6.13% |
| Sergey Kolosovsky | Independent | 4,639 | 4.59% |
| Aleksey Fyodorov | Independent | 4,498 | 4.45% |
| Nyazip Sarvarov | Independent | 3,132 | 3.10% |
| Andrey Koshelenko | Independent | 1,326 | 1.31% |
| Anatoly Kolmogorov | Independent | 761 | 0.75% |
| Viktor Starokozhev | Independent | 548 | 0.54% |
| Anatoly Klygin | Independent | 528 | 0.52% |
| Anatoly Martyanov | Independent | 481 | 0.48% |
| Igor Kalitnikov | Independent | 454 | 0.45% |
| Aleksandr Kruk | Independent | 436 | 0.43% |
| Andrey Panpurin | Independent | 155 | 0.15% |
| Nikolay Arzhannikov | Independent | 9 | 0.01% |
| against all | | 11,129 | 11.01% |
| Total | | 101,037 | 100% |
| Eligible voters/turnout | | 477,945 | 21.14% |

=== 1998 ===
Summary of the 12 April 1998 by-election in the Ordzhonikidzevsky constituency
| Candidate | Party | Votes | % |
|---|---|---|---|
| Dmitry Golovanov | Independent | 44,623 | 26.55% |
| Valery Terletsky | Independent | 41,379 | 24.62% |
| against all | | 67,695 | 40.28% |
| Total | | 168,072 | 100% |

=== 1999 ===
A by-election was scheduled after Against all line received the most votes.

Summary of the 19 December 1999 Russian legislative election in the Ordzhonikidzevsky constituency
| Candidate | Party | Votes | % |
|---|---|---|---|
| Nadezhda Golubkova | Women of Russia | 52,290 | 20.80% |
| Aleksandr Khabarov | Independent | 52,079 | 20.71% |
| Vladimir Isakov | Independent | 33,651 | 13.38% |
| Vladimir Popov | Union of Right Forces | 18,260 | 7.26% |
| Vladimir Karzhavin | Spiritual Heritage | 8,114 | 3.23% |
| Eduard Markin | Andrey Nikolayev and Svyatoslav Fyodorov Bloc | 5,257 | 2.09% |
| Olga Korostelyova | Independent | 4,541 | 1.81% |
| Sergey Kozyrev | For Civil Dignity | 2,762 | 1.10% |
| Aleksandr Melkov | Independent | 1,674 | 0.67% |
| Pavel Masharakin | Independent | 692 | 0.28% |
| against all | | 64,287 | 25.57% |
| Total | | 251,445 | 100% |

=== 2000 ===
Summary of the 26 March 2000 by-election in the Ordzhonikidzevsky constituency
| Candidate | Party | Votes | % |
|---|---|---|---|
| Nikolay Ovchinnikov | Independent | 63,972 | 21.81% |
| Aleksandr Khabarov | Independent | 53,021 | 18.07% |
| Nadezhda Golubkova | Independent | 51,624 | 17.60% |
| Albert Makashov | Independent | 30,988 | 10.56% |
| Rimma Varnavskaya | Independent | 20,909 | 7.13% |
| Vladimir Ovchinnikov | Independent | 14,682 | 5.01% |
| Vladimir Popov | Independent | 7,669 | 2.61% |
| against all | | 41,362 | 14.10% |
| Total | | 293,348 | 100% |

=== 2003 ===
Summary of the 7 December 2003 Russian legislative election in the Ordzhonikidzevsky constituency
| Candidate | Party | Votes | % |
|---|---|---|---|
| Yevgeny Roizman | Independent | 106,009 | 39.99% |
| Nadezhda Golubkova | United Russia | 31,105 | 11.73% |
| Vasily Rudenko | Independent | 22,238 | 8.39% |
| Sergey Cherkasov | People's Party | 18,756 | 7.08% |
| Andrey Alshevskikh | Independent | 15,259 | 5.76% |
| Valery Yablonskikh | Communist Party | 9,693 | 3.66% |
| Olga Kharitonova | Great Russia – Eurasian Union | 9,024 | 3.40% |
| Grigory Sapozhnikov | Liberal Democratic Party | 5,174 | 1.95% |
| against all | | 40,499 | 15.28% |
| Total | | 265,834 | 100% |

=== 2016 ===
Summary of the 18 September 2016 Russian legislative election in the Beryozovsky constituency
| Candidate | Party | Votes | % |
|---|---|---|---|
| Sergey Chepikov | United Russia | 89,675 | 43.64% |
| Dmitry Ionin | A Just Russia | 31,288 | 15.22% |
| Yevgeny Borovik | Communist Party | 26,007 | 12.65% |
| Pavel Davletshin | Liberal Democratic Party | 17,935 | 8.73% |
| Valery Molokov | Party of Growth | 7,556 | 3.68% |
| Mikhail Borisov | People's Freedom Party | 7,104 | 3.46% |
| Igor Ruzakov | The Greens | 5,814 | 2.83% |
| Ruslan Khasanzyanov | Communists of Russia | 4,364 | 2.12% |
| Daniil Voronov | Patriots of Russia | 3,220 | 1.57% |
| Total | | 208,845 | 100% |

=== 2021 ===
Summary of the 17-19 September 2021 Russian legislative election in the Beryozovsky constituency
| Candidate | Party | Votes | % |
|---|---|---|---|
| Sergey Chepikov (incumbent) | United Russia | 76,231 | 33.97% |
| Aleksey Parfenov | Communist Party | 46,852 | 20.88% |
| Irina Vinogradova | New People | 24,715 | 11.01% |
| Vladimir Vorozhtsov | Party of Pensioners | 16,096 | 7.17% |
| Kirill Nekrasov | Liberal Democratic Party | 14,471 | 6.45% |
| Roman Zykov | Russian Party of Freedom and Justice | 13,573 | 6.05% |
| Albert Khusnutdinov | Yabloko | 7,540 | 3.36% |
| Sergey Kapchuk | Party of Growth | 5,859 | 2.61% |
| Yaroslav Podshivalov | Rodina | 4,602 | 2.05% |
| Total | | 224,432 | 100% |

=== 2026 ===
Summary of the 18-20 September 2026 Russian legislative election in the Beryozovsky constituency
| Candidate | Party | Votes | % |
|---|---|---|---|
| Vladimir Smirnov | United Russia | 69,460 | 33.13% |
| Andrey Pinyazhin | Communist Party | 33,894 | 16.17% |
| Rant Krayev | New People | 29,022 | 13.84% |
| Igor Popov | Liberal Democratic Party | 23,962 | 11.43% |
| Ivan Dzhalalov | A Just Russia | 22,970 | 10.96% |
| Viktor Chupriyanov | Yabloko | 17,149 | 8.18% |
| Radik Sharayev | The Greens | 5,046 | 2.41% |
| Total | | 209,667 | 100% |
