= Turchaninov family =

Russian noble family

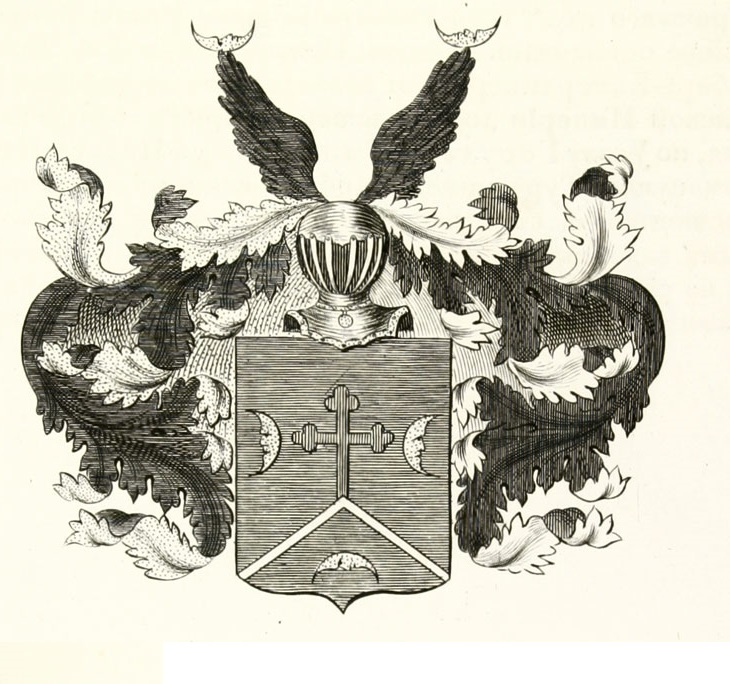
The coat of arms of Alexander Turchaninov's family

The Turchaninov family (Russian: Турчанинов, sometimes transliterated as Turchin) was the name of several noble families in the Russian Empire.

== Etymology ==
The name Turchaninov might have originated from the archaic word turchanin (Russian: турчанин), meaning "Turk". This term was traditionally used for Turkish prisoners captured during the Russo-Turkish wars.

== Alexander Turchaninov ==
Alexander Turchaninov (Russian: Александр Александрович Турчанинов) was the son of a Turkish officer. As a boy, he was taken prisoner, baptised, and brought to the court. Alexander served as a valet at court beginning in 1754. On 22 January 1762, by the decree of the Emperor Peter III, Alexander Turchaninov was granted the rank of Colonel. He was also ennobled. On 19 December 1796 Paul I confirmed the title and extended it to Alexander Turchaninov's heirs. Both his sons, Peter and Pavel, served as Rittmeisters in the 3rd Hussar Regiment of the Imperial Russian Army. His daughter, Anna (1774–1848) was a poet. Her poetry collection Otryvki iz sochinenij (Russian: Отрывки из сочинений, lit. "Fragments From Works") was published in Saint Petersburg in 1803. Lettres philosophiques de Mr. Fontaine et de m-lle Tourtchaniniff was published in Paris in 1817.

== Philip Turchaninov ==
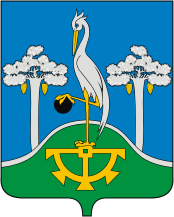
A heron from the Turchaninov coat of arms appears on the emblem of Sysert.

Another Turchaninov line originated in the 17th century. The founder of the dynasty was Philip Turchaninov, whose origin is unknown. One theory claims he was a Turkish prisoner brought to Russia during the Russo-Turkish War of 1676–1681. His son Mikhail married Anna Rostovshikova, the daughter of a Solikamsk manufacturer. Mikhail initially worked in salt production, the main industry in Solikamsk, but later switched to copper mining. In 1731 he managed to build his own factory, the Troitsky Copper Smelting Plant. The family's rise to prominence is tied to Alexei Turchaninov, a prosperous businessman in the Urals. Originally a salesman, he married Mikhail's daughter and inherited the factory. He was made a nobleman by Catherine the Great in 1783. He had eight children with his second wife, Filatseta Stepanovna, most notably:

- Natalya (1773–1834), married Nikolay Koltovsky in 1789. Had two sons, Pavel and Vladimir, from liaison with Dmitry Tatishchev. Their successors ran the plants till 1912.
- Yelizaveta (1774–1827), married Alexey Titov.
- Nadezhda (1778–1850), married Mark Ivelich, Russian diplomat and lieutenant general of Serbian descent, in 1798. He later became a member of the Governing Senate. One of their sons Nicholai Ivelich (1797–1875) became a count.

=== Notable family members ===
- Alexei Turchaninov (1704/1705–1787)
- Pavel Solomirsky (1801–1861)
- Dmitry Solomirsky, his son
- Alexander Turchaninov (1838–1907), Russian lawyer.

== Noble family of Don Cossacks ==
The Turchaninovs were a noble family of Don Cossacks origin from stanitsa Aksayskaya and Starocherkasskaya.

Notable family members

- Vasily Nikolaevich Turchaninov
- Ivan Turchaninov (1821–1901) from the same lineage, was later known as John Basil Turchin, a Union army brigadier general in the American Civil War.

== See also ==
- Pavel Turchaninov (1776–1839), Russian lieutenant general during Napoleonic wars.
- Andrey Turchaninov (1779–1830), his younger brother, the lieutenant general during Napoleonic wars.
