= Turchaninov =

Turchaninov is a Russian surname. It originated from the archaic word turchanin (Russian: турчанин), meaning "Turk".

It which may refer to:

- Turchaninov family, a noble family in the Russian Empire.
- Alexei Turchaninov (1704/1705–1787)
- Pyotr Ivanovitch Turchaninov (born 1746–c. 1823), Secretary of State on military questions of Catherine I of Russia. He had two sons:
  - Pavel Turchaninov (1776—1839), Russian lieutenant general during the Napoleonic Wars.
  - Andrey Turchaninov (1779–1830), his younger brother, the lieutenant general.
- Nikolai Turczaninow or Turchaninov (1796-1863), botanist
- Lev Chernyi, born Pavel Dimitrievich Turchaninov (c. 1878–1921), Russian anarchist, activist and poet, and a leading figure of the Third Russian Revolution
- Ivan Turchaninov (1821-1901), Union Army general in the American Civil War
