= Aramil (inhabited locality) =

Aramil (Russian: Арамиль) is the name of several inhabited localities in Sysertsky District of Sverdlovsk Oblast, Russia.

Urban localities

- Aramil, a town

Rural localities

- Aramil (rural locality), a settlement
