= Sysertsky =

Sysertsky (masculine), Sysertskaya (feminine), or Sysertskoye (neuter) may refer to:

- Sysertsky District, a district of Sverdlovsk Oblast, Russia
- Sysertsky Urban Okrug, a municipal formation in Sverdlovsk Oblast, Russia, which the town of Sysert is incorporated as
