= Fakel =

Fakel (Факел, Russian for "torch") may refer to:

- Fakel (journal), a Soviet literary journal
- Fakel (company), a Russian paramilitary company and bi-annual Gazprom corporate talent competition
- Fakel Novy Urengoy, a Russian volleyball club
- FC Fakel Varva, a Ukrainian football club based in Varva
- FC Fakel Voronezh, a Russian football club based in Voronezh
- HK Fakel Bogdanovich, a Russian bandy club based in Bogdanovich
- MKB Fakel, a Russian government-owned aerospace defense corporation
- OKB Fakel, a Russian electric propulsion system development company
