= Pavel Solomirsky =

Russian businessman (1801–1861)

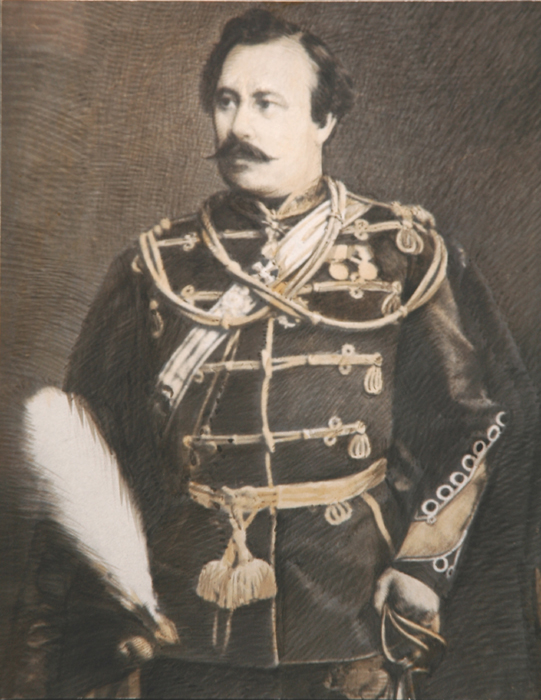
The portrait of Pavel Solomirsky, mid-19th century.

Pavel Solomirsky (Russian: Павел Дмитриевич Соломирский; 1801–1861) was a business magnate in the Russian Empire. He was a member of the noble Turchaninov family,

== Biography ==
Solomirsky was born as the result of the extramarital affair between Natalya Koltovskaya (née Turchaninova), a daughter of Alexei Turchaninov, and the diplomat Dmitry Tatishchev. A rumour circulated that Pavel's father was Paul I himself, because the Emperor favoured Natalya. There were some similarities in Pavel Solomirsky's and the Emperor's appearance, but no documents support this version. As Natalya' children Pavel and Vladimir were born outside of marriage, the custom dictated that they could not inherit the family name of their father Dmitry Tatishchev. They were called "Solomirsky" instead, the family name of Tatishchev's ancestors.

Pavel Solomirsky served as Polkovnik in the Imperial Guard, retired with the rank of Major General. At the end of his military career he occupied himself with the family business—running the factories from the Sysert Mining District, which he inherited from his mother. They were extremely profitable at that time. Pavel Solomirsky inherited the Polevskoy Copper Smelting Plant, Seversky Pipe Plant and Sysertsky Plant. He proved himself a proactive and capable businessman, increasing the family wealth. New plants were opened in the Sysert Mining District, e.g. he commissioned new blast furnaces for the Sysertsky Plant in 1847 and in 1859, opened the Ilyinsky Plant in 1854 and so on.

== Personal life ==
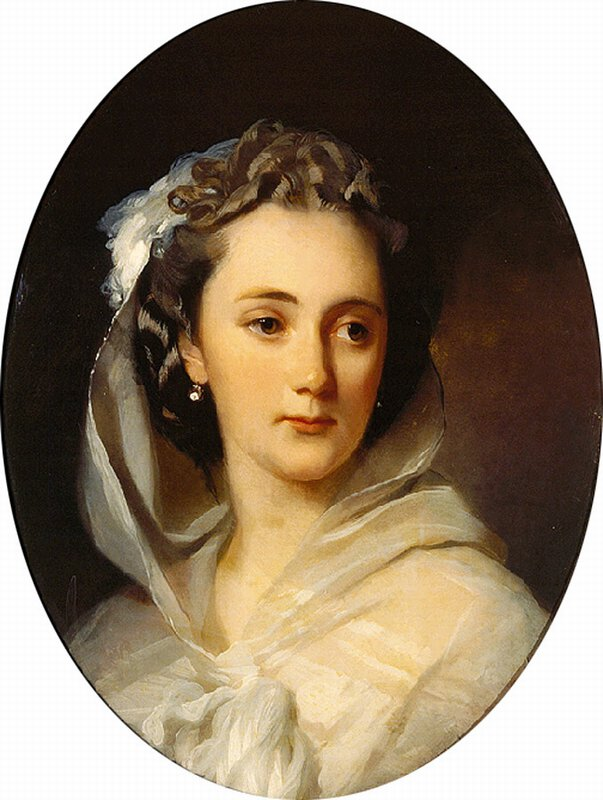
Ivan Makarov, Portrait of Solomirskaya, 1850s. This is the portrait Pavel Solomirsky's daughter Anna or Natalya.

On July 1, 1835, Pavel Solomirsky married a lady-in-waiting Yekaterina Bulgakova (1811—1880), the oldest daughter of the Moscow post director Alexander Bulgakov. She was a renowned beauty.

They had children:

- Olga Solomirskaya (1837–1888), married name Kroneberg.
- Dmitry (1838–1923)
- Yekaterina (1839–1858), married to the vice admiral Leonid Ukhtomsky.
- Lev (1841–1879)
- Mariya (?)
- Aleksandra
- Anna, married family name Peninskaya.
- Natalya (1847–1893), married the governor Andrey Vsevolozhsky.
- Alexander (1852–?)
