= Alexei Turchaninov =

Russian business magnate (1705–1787)

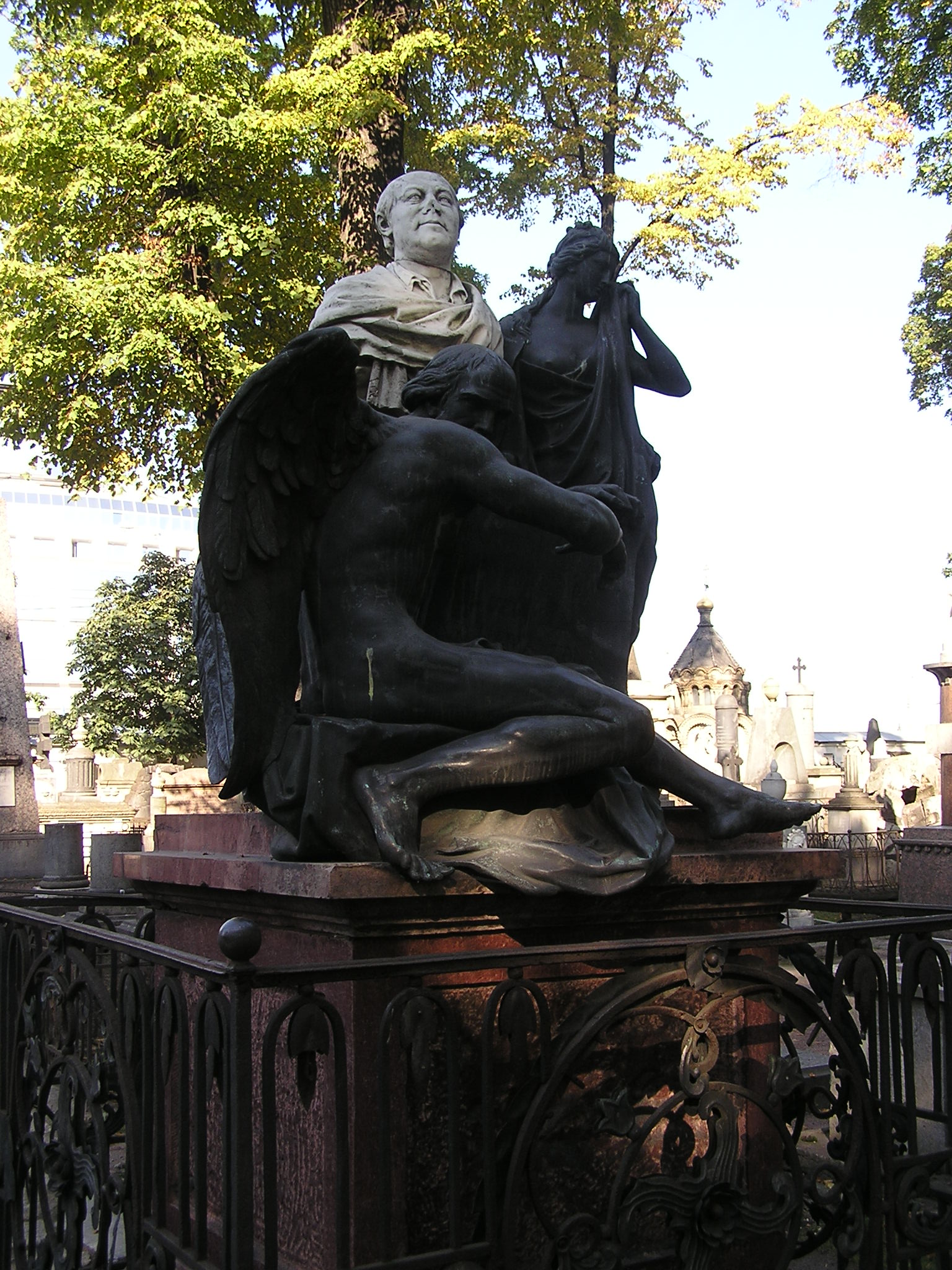
Turchaninov's marble gravestone at the Lazarevskoe Cemetery (in the Alexander Nevsky Lavra).

Alexei Fedorovich Turchaninov (Russian: Алексей Фёдорович Турчанинов; born Alexei Fedorovich Vasilyev; 1704/1705 – March 21, 1787) was a business magnate in the Russian Empire, grandfather of Pavel and Dmitry Solomirsky, the member of the wealthy Turchaninov family.

== Biography ==
Alexei Vasilyev served the Turchaninov family since childhood. His origin is unknown. He proved himself a capable salesman and eventually got more important tasks to perform. In 1737 he married the daughter of Michail Turchaninov, Fedosya, and took his wife's surname. He took control of their fortune when he was about 20 years old. He placed high emphasis on metallurgy at the Troitsky Copper Smelting Plant, constantly seeking to improve the product quality.

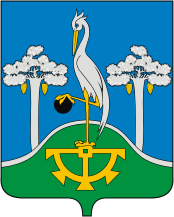
Alexei Turchaninov's heron on the coat of arms of Sysert.

He supplied high-quality copper cookware to the court and gained favour with the Empress Elizabeth. In 1758 he used his connections at the court and became the owner of the three plants in the Ural region. He was permitted to purchase the Gumyoshevsky mine along with the Polevskoy Copper Smelting Plant, Seversky Pipe Plant and Sysertsky Plant for 145,5 thousand rubles. These factories represented the so-called Sysert Mining District (Russian: Сысертский горнозаводской округ, romanized: Sysertskij gornozavodskoj okrug). They were extremely profitable.

Turchaninov reorganized the production process and changed the focus from producing metal only to making other products, such as flat iron, roofing iron, household items and so on. The Mining Commission that supervised the plants in 1766 was very satisfied with the result. They said in their report that Turchaninov multiplied the performance capabilities of the plants.

Turchaninov engaged in philanthropy. He was known for caring about his workers. He ordered to give away timber, poles, firewood to local populace for free. Once a year the workers had a month's holiday, fully paid. Medicines, health care and schooling were free as well. Turchaninov built the zoo, the botanical garden, two museums, and the library in Sysert. He founded several settlements in the Ural region. He started the mining of malachite and managed to create a high demand for the product.

During Pugachev's Rebellion (1773—1775) he organized the defences and led the people himself. Turchaninov managed to repel all the attacks by the rebel forces, preventing them from advancing further to Yekaterinburg. Mostly due to these acts of bravery Catherine the Great granted him nobility in 1783. His new coat of arms included "a silver heron holding a stone". The image of a heron was used as a brand of the metallurgical plants in the Sysert Mining District till the 20th century.

== Children ==
In 1763 Turchaninov's first wife Fedosya died, leaving him with no heirs. He remarried Filatseta Stepanovna, a woman of common birth. They had 8 children together.

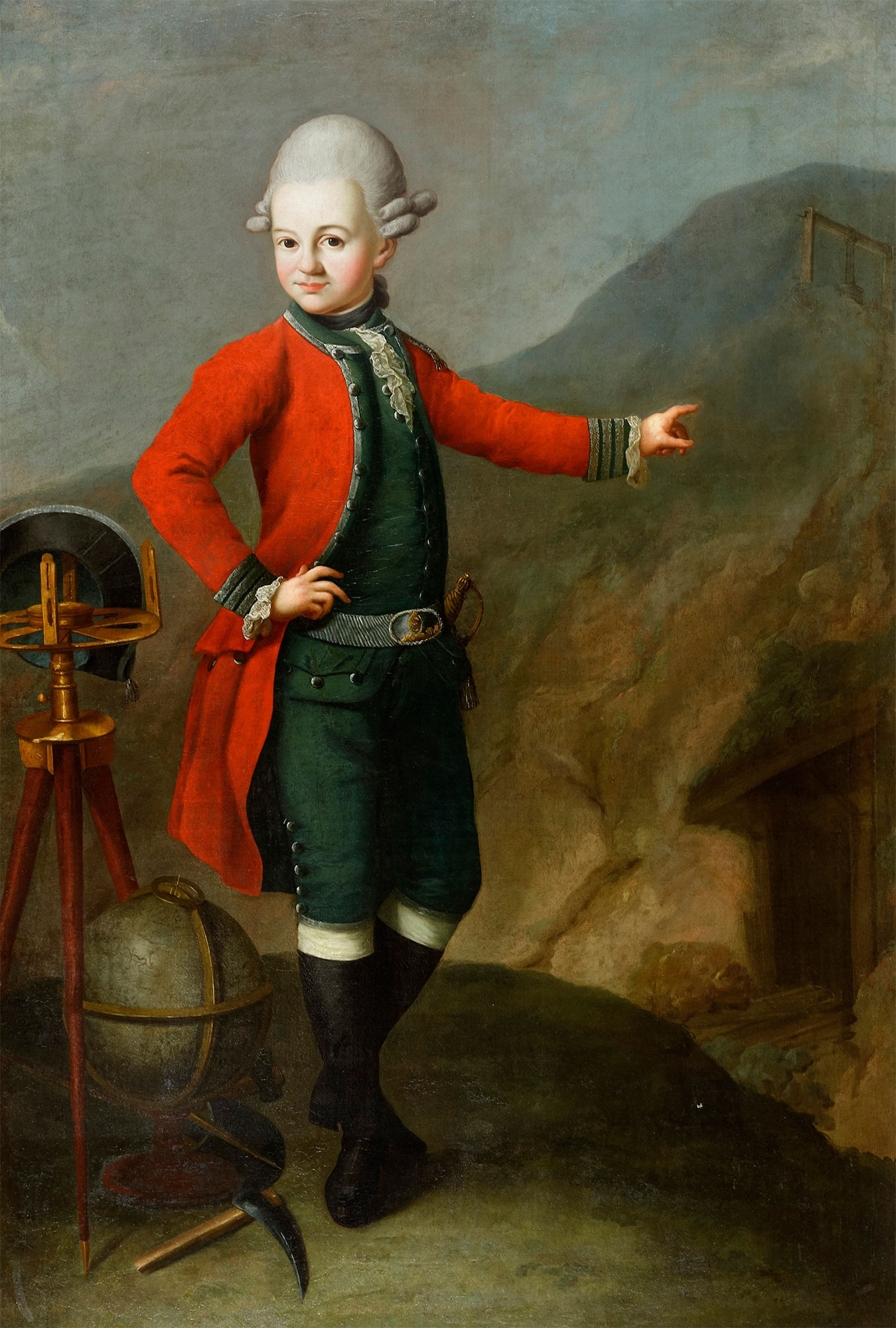
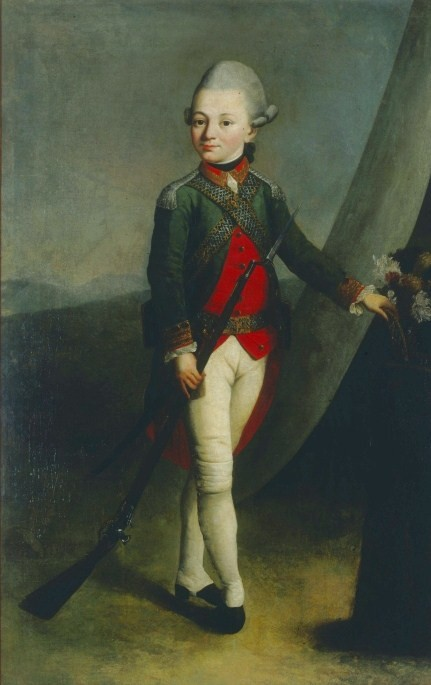
The 1777 portraits of Alexey and Pyotr Turchaninov.
- Alexey (1766—1839), is notable for his marriage to Aleksandra Yermolaeva ( 1775—?). She was the first Russian woman to perform a balloon flight (over Moscow in 1804). The marriage ended with a divorce.
- Pyotr (1769—1815)
- Alexander (1772—1796), Colonel.
- Yekaterina, married to Alexander Kokoshkin in 1784. They had a son Sergey (1785—1861), the infantry general; a daughter Varvara (died in 1842) was married to Pyotr Kleinmichel.
- Natalya Koltovskaya (1773—1834), married Nikolay Koltovsky in 1789. Had two sons Pavel and Vladimir from liaison with Dmitry Tatishchev. Their successors ran the plants till 1912.
- Yelizaveta Titova (1774—1827), married Alexey Titov. With her sisters Natalya and Nadezhda, Yelizaveta was the co-heiress of her father's business.
- Nadezhda (1778—1850), married Mark Ivelich, Russian diplomat and the lieutenant general of Serbian descent, in 1798. He later became a member of the Governing Senate. One of their sons Nicholai Ivelich (1797-1875) became a count.
- Anna (1780—1849), married Nikolay Zubov in 1796.
