= Center for Jewish-Bulgarian cooperation Aleph =

The Center for Jewish-Bulgarian cooperation "Aleph" /CJBC/ is a non-profit organization in Bulgaria that promotes good relations and education between Bulgarians, Israelis and Jews of all nationalities.

Aleph was established in Burgas in 2014 by both Jews and Bulgarians. "Aleph" is a nonpartisan, voluntary, public and democratic self-organization, which operates under Bulgarian law. The Chairman and founder is Alberta Leon Alkalaj. The association is named after the first letter in the Hebrew alphabet, Aleph.

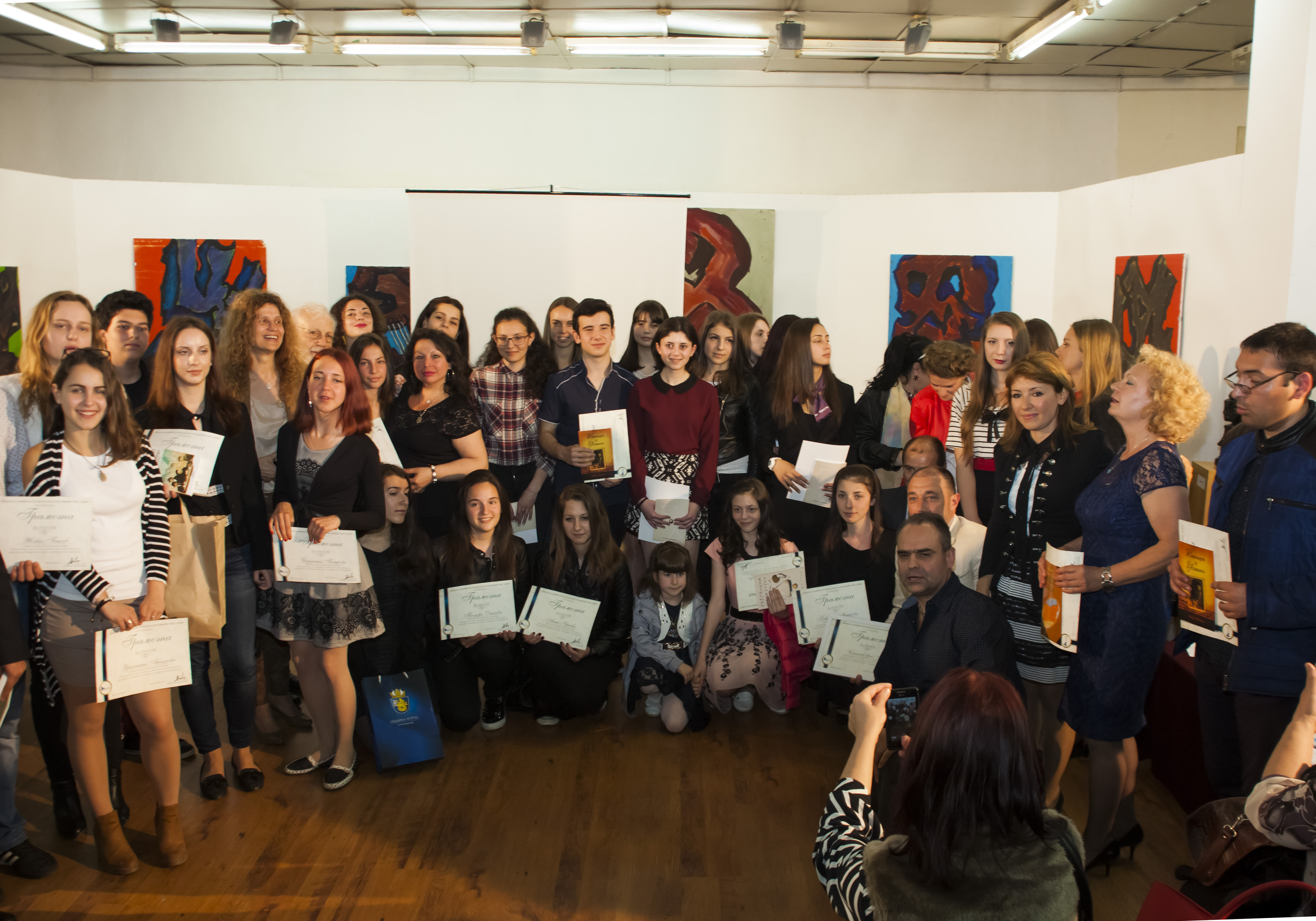
Participants in Aleph's National literary contest

== Significant initiatives ==
- At the initiative of "Aleph" the former mayor of Burgas (1939–1944) Dr. Dyanko Pravchev and the writer and public figure Petko Chorbadjiev were proclaimed honorary citizens of Burgas for their efforts to prevent the deportation of Jews from Burgas in 1943.
- Aleph initiated a petition in support of the idea during a solemn salutes-checks holidays to mention the names of the fallen heroes from all ethnic groups – Jews, Armenians, Turks and Roma.
- Aleph is a sponsor for the construction of the memorial in memory of the victims of the terrorist attack at Burgas Airport.
- At the initiative of Aleph, the Burgas Art Gallery, housed in a former synagogue, restored its functions of the temple. In 2013, for the first time in 70 years a religious ceremony was held as part of the memorial evening "Memory rescue of Bulgarian Jews." After this consecration in the former synagogue there can be performed official religious rituals in the canon of Judaism.

== National student literary contest ==
The national student literary contest "Whoever saves one life saves the whole world" is among the most significant initiatives of Aleph. The competition is for young people aged 14–19 years. It was established in 2013 on the occasion of the 70th anniversary of the rescue of Bulgarian Jews from the Nazi death camps. For three years verbal race it has become one of the most popular literary competitions for students in the country.

The works of students are assessed by the jury: Mihailina Pavlova – radio journalist and editor of the newspaper "Jewish News" and the magazine "La Estreya" and Rumen Leonidov.

The authors of the best works receive cash bonuses, Diplomas and books. The essays ranked first are published in leading Bulgarian media. Before and after each competition Center "Aleph" issued specialized newspaper that announces the winners published posts and excerpts from essays.

In 2013, nearly 40 students participate in the competition of essays on the topic "Whoever saves one life saves the whole world.

The second edition in 2014 is dedicated to the 100th anniversary of the First World War. The theme was "Jews and Bulgarians – two people, one country, one love." With their essays in the competition were included more than 60 high school students from 28 settlements in the country

In 2016 the theme "Art is a scene that blurs any differences or the contribution of Bulgarian Jews in the culture of the country" aroused the interest of 90 high school students from different cities.

Announced is the fourth edition of the competition. In 2017 the theme is: "Shimon Peres and his contribution to the dimensions of universal Humanism." The results will be announced at a traditional ceremony in Burgas Art Gallery "Petko Zadgorski" in the spring of 2017. The winner of the fourth edition of the competition will be rewarded with participation in a week-long international seminar for young leaders in Herzliya at the expense of CJBC "Aleph"

== Virtual library ==
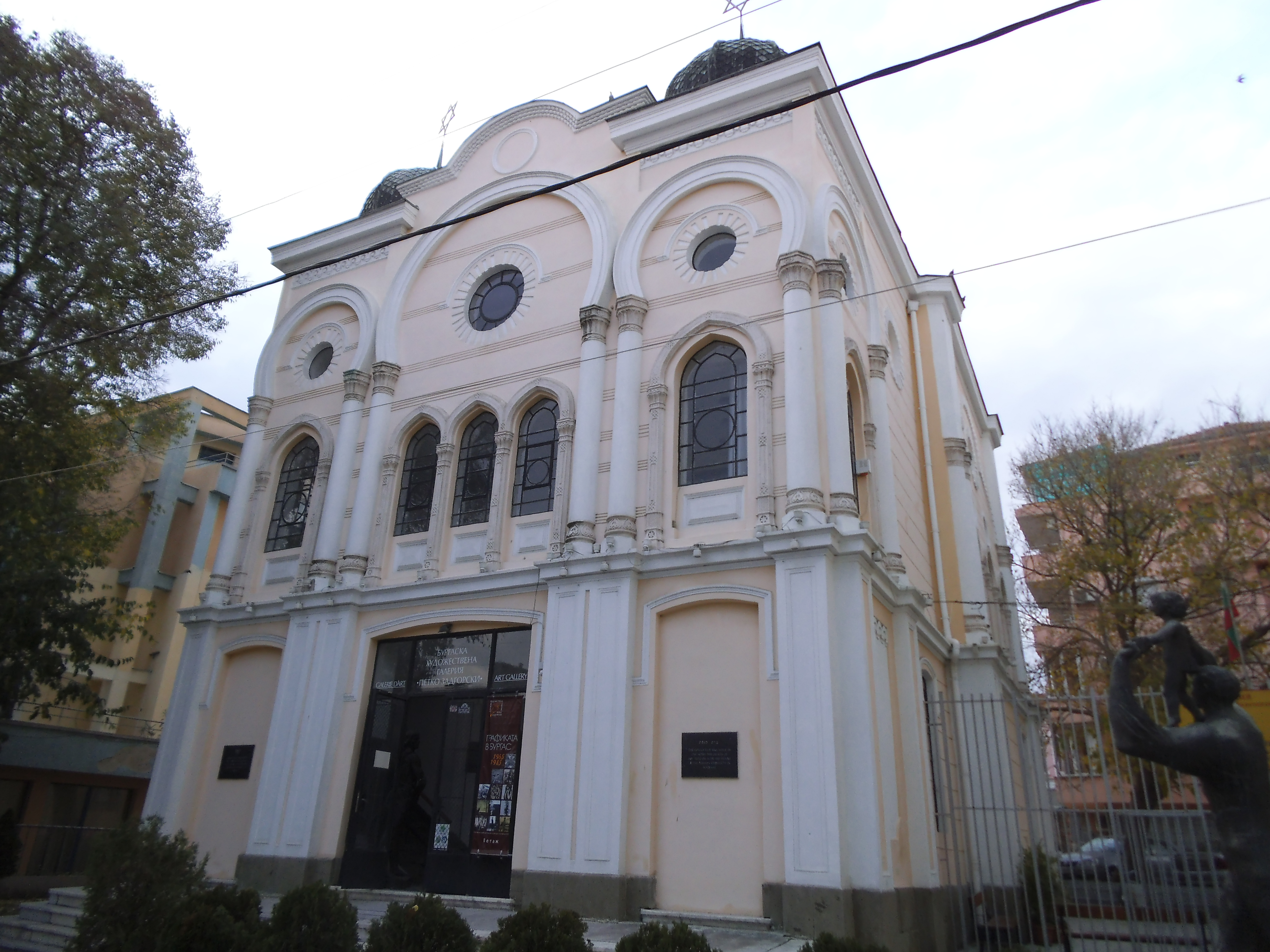
A synagogue in Burgas

In 2014 on its site, "Aleph" creates unique and unique Bulgarian-Jewish Virtual Library. Initially it was created to help participants in the literary competition. Subsequently, enriched and supplemented with new sections and genres. In 2017 it already has a solid bibliographic array of authentic documents, historical references, little known facts about the most – popular Bulgarian artists of Jewish origin in literature, music, art, theater and cinema, curricula vitae, publication of parts of famous literary works, paintings and multimedia digital archive.

Center "Aleph" conducts deeper collective and researching work. The main part there is a documentary movie "Remembering", which brings from the collective heroism of the Bulgarian people the names of local Politicians and Intellectuals led the public outrage against the deportation of Jews from Burgas and managed to recapture the lives of their fellow citizens. The film was broadcast on national and regional television stations, special screenings are organized in all Secondary schools in Burgas, it is presented to the Rotary club, and the Jewish community in Sofia and Plovdiv.
