= Fakel (journal) =

Literary journal for Soviet literature

Fakel (Факел; The Torch) was founded as a literary journal for Soviet literature in translation in Bulgaria in 1981. Although intended as one of several publications which flooded the country with official works approved by the Soviet authorities, from the very beginning, the idea of the editors was to turn it unobtrusively into a journal for anti-Soviet literature. The name of the journal may have been a play on the famous Soviet journal Ogonek (the little flame).

== History and profile ==
Fakel was launched in 1981. The Bulgarian poet Georgi Borissov was first appointed as its vice editor-in-chief before becoming editor-in-chief in 1990. He is the founder and director of the publishing houses Fakel (1991–1995) and Fakel Express (1995). He has been the editor-in-chief of the magazine since 1990. Poet and translator Rumen Leonidov is another co-founder of Fakel magazine.

Quite unexpectedly, the journal became very popular for it started publishing authors such as Mikhail Bulgakov, Yevgeny Zamyatin, Andrei Platonov, Nabokov, Boris Pasternak, Vasily Grossman, Varlam Shalamov, Venedikt Erofeev, Vladimir Voinovich, as well as poems and essays by Velimir Khlebnikov, Osip Mandelstam, Marina Tsvetaeva, Akhmatova, Joseph Brodsky and Vladimir Vysotsky.

With the fall of communism in Bulgaria, Fakel, due to its previous notoriety, served as a natural intellectual catalyst in what is widely described as the "transition period" in the countries of Central and Eastern Europe.

The journal published along the works of Andrei Platonov, Nikolai Berdyaev, Sergei Bulgakov, Daniil Kharms, Yuz Aleshkovsky, Tatyana Tolstaya, Dmitri Prigov, Eduard Uspensky, Eduard Limonov, Alexander Genis, Vladimir Bukovsky etc., works by authors such as Marquis de Custine, G. K. Chesterton, George Orwell, C. G. Jung, Jaroslav Hašek, Zbigniew Herbert, Czesław Miłosz, Arthur Miller, Harold Pinter, Václav Havel, Günter Grass, Robert Conquest, Mircea Dinescu, Milan Kundera, Milorad Pavić, Danilo Kiš, Dubravka Ugrešić, etc., related in many different ways to the origins and the disintegration of totalitarian societies.

In 2015 Georgi Borissov received the "Russian Award" at the International Literature Competition for publishing Fakel.
