= AK-47 (group) =

Russian rap group

- Origin: Beryozovsky, Sverdlovsk Oblast, Russia
- Genres: Hip hop
- Members: Vitya AK, Maksi AK

AK-47 is a Russian rap group from Beryozovsky, Sverdlovsk Oblast, Russia, founded in 2004 and named after the Kalashnikov assault rifle. The group consists of two members, known by their stage names Vitya AK (real name Vitaly Viktorovich Gostyukhin) and Maxi AK (real name Maksim Sergeevich Brylin).

== Discography ==
=== Studio albums ===
- 2009 — Berezovskiy
- 2010 — "МегаPolice"
- 2015 — "Третий"
- 2016 — "ТГК/АК-47"
- 2017 — "Новый"
- 2022 — "АКТГК" (with "Triagrutrika")
- 2024 — "Пятый"

== Filmography ==
- In 2019, Vitya AK starred in the short film Last Quest by Pyotr Fyodorov, which is about a drug-addicted office worker.

== Awards ==
- 2010: At the Russia Street Awards, the group won in the "Hip-Hop Discovery of the Year" category.
