= Sukhoy Log =

Sukhoy Log (Russian: Сухой Лог) is the name of several inhabited localities in Russia.

Urban localities

- Sukhoy Log, Sverdlovsk Oblast, a town in Sukholozhsky District of Sverdlovsk Oblast

Rural localities

- Sukhoy Log, Belgorod Oblast, a khutor in Dmitriyevsky Rural Okrug of Rakityansky District of Belgorod Oblast
- Sukhoy Log, Kishertsky District, Perm Krai, a village in Kishertsky District, Perm Krai
- Sukhoy Log, Okhansky District, Perm Krai, a village in Okhansky District, Perm Krai
- Sukhoy Log, Rostov Oblast, a khutor in Kazanskolopatinskoye Rural Settlement of Verkhnedonskoy District of Rostov Oblast
- Sukhoy Log, Stavropol Krai, a settlement in Kirovsky Selsoviet of Trunovsky District of Stavropol Krai
- Sukhoy Log, Tomsk Oblast, a selo in Chainsky District of Tomsk Oblast
- Sukhoi Log mine - a major gold deposit in Irkutsk Oblast
