= Dmitry Solomirsky =

Russian businessman and philanthropist (1838–1923)

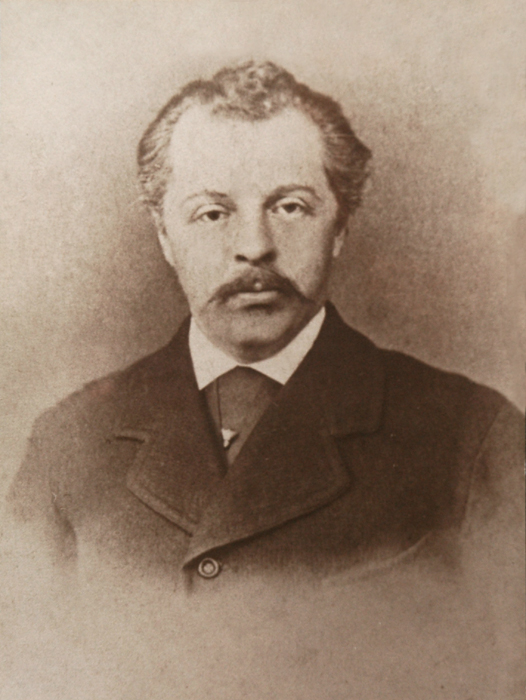
The portrait of Dmitry Solomirsky.

Dmitry Solomirsky (Russian: Дмитрий Павлович Соломирский; 1838–1923) was a business magnate and philanthropist in the Russian Empire, the member of the wealthy Turchaninov family. He was the second child of Pavel Solomirsky and his wife Yekaterina.

== Career ==
Dmitry Solomirsky graduated from the Moscow State University, the Department of Law, and served as a government official in Perm, Saint Petersburg, and later Yekaterinburg. He left the government service in 1879, moved to the Urals and took care of the family business, i.e. the profitable factories from the Sysert Mining District, which he inherited from his father. He purchased the shares that belonged to the other family members, and by 1906 owned 103 of 126 shares. He supported the renovation of the factories and the construction of new furnaces. The dams were rebuilt and strengthened in order to preserve environment, Solomirsky switched to gas and peat as the main sources of fuel, he initiated the exploration of new deposits and was able to significantly improve the product quality. Dmitry Solomirsky also opened the Sysert's girls orphanage, funded the construction of hospitals, schools and churches next to his factories.

== Later life ==
At the end of the 19th century the combination of the economic crisis, the Russo-Japanese War, and the Revolution of 1905 led Dmitry Solomirsky to bankruptcy. Metal price greatly decreased, Solomirsky had to cut workers' salaries. He started to receive death threats, an attempt on his life was made once. In 1912 he decided to sell his business. All members of the Solomirsky family moved to France before 1917. He remained in Russia, but was barely able to make ends meet. The Ural Naturalist Society petitioned the Soviet government, and a small pension was granted to Solomirsky. Not much is known about his later years. He presumably lived with one of the former employees.
