= Malik Gaisin =

Russian politician (born 1959)

Malik Favzaviyevich Gaisin (Russian: Ма́лик Фавзавиевич Га́йсин; born 26 February 1959, in Sverdlovsk) is a Russian entrepreneur and politician from Urals. He holds, or held, stakes in many major ventures in the region. In the past (1995–2000) he served as member of State Duma of the Russian Federation.

== Biography ==
In the end of 1980s he founded one of the first private businesses in Sverdlovsk that transformed into a limited company specializing in buying vouchers. Later Gaisin through this company managed to acquire regional agricultural holdings. In 2004 claims were published, suggesting that Gaisin owned about 10% industry in the Urals at the time with share packages in more than 100 enterprises.

He was elected State Duma deputy in 1995 at Kamensk-Uralsky electoral district № 163. As a member of parliament, he served in the Duma's Committee on Budget, Taxes, Banks and Finance in Moscow.

He was involved in many operations with industrial stakes in Urals, particularly with shares in the major Yekaterinburg factory Uralhimmash, where he was appointed director in 2008. In 2014 he became head of Kalinin Machine-Building Plant. Latest news reports state that he is currently interested in state-owned bakery business in Beryozovsky, Sverdlovsk Oblast.
