= Bogdanovichsky District =

District in Sverdlovsk Oblast, Russia

Bogdanovichsky District Богдановичский район (Russian)
- District
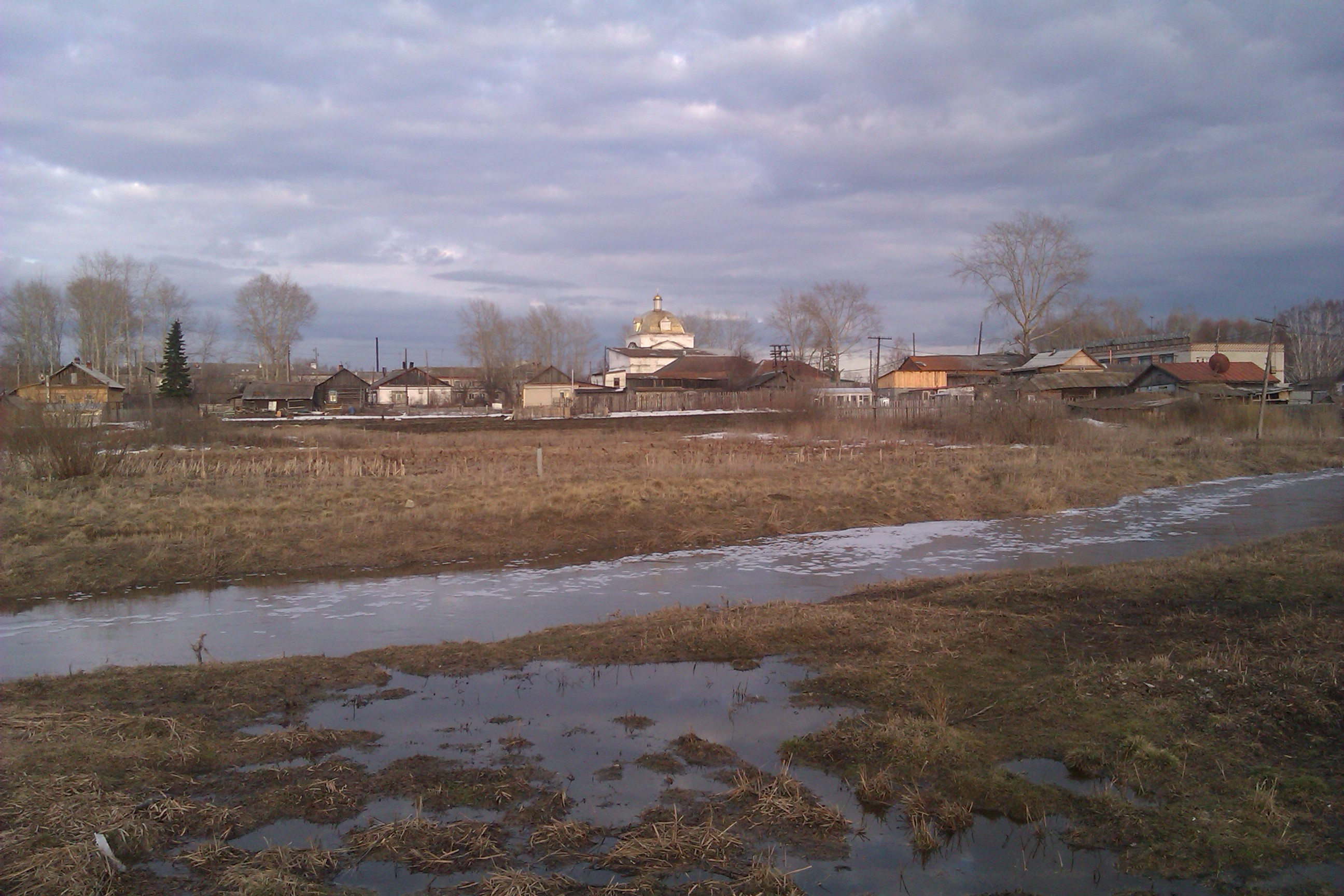
- Gryaznovskoye settlement, Bogdanovichsky District

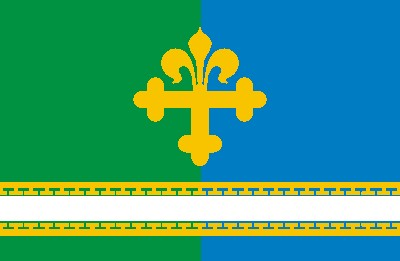
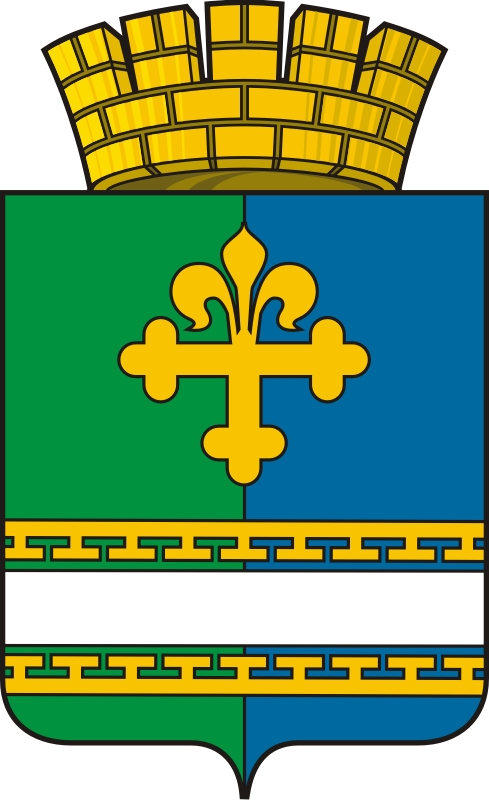
- Flag Coat of arms
- Coordinates: 56.689°N 61.803°E
- Country: Russia
- Federal subject: Sverdlovsk Oblast
- Established: 1 January 2006
- Administrative center: Bogdanovich

Area
  - Total: 1,497.99 km^{2} (578.38 sq mi)

Population (2010 Census)
  - Total: 16,357
  - Density: 10.919/km^{2} (28.281/sq mi)
  - Urban: 0%
  - Rural: 100%

Administrative structure
  - Inhabited localities: 1 cities/towns, 39 rural localities

Municipal structure
  - Municipally incorporated as: Bogdanovich Urban Okrug
- Time zone: UTC+5 (MSK+2)
- OKTMO ID: 65707000
- Website: http://www.gobogdanovich.ru/

Bogdanovichsky District (Russian: Богдано́вичский райо́н) is an administrative district (raion), one of the thirty in Sverdlovsk Oblast, Russia. As a municipal division, it is incorporated as Bogdanovich Urban Okrug. Its administrative center is the town of Bogdanovich. Population (excluding the administrative center): 16,357 (2010 Census); 18,042 (2002 census); 18,569 (1989 Soviet census).
