= Sverdlovsk constituency =

Russian legislative constituency

Sverdlovsk single-member constituency
- Constituency of the Russian State Duma
- Deputy: Andrey Alshevskikh; United Russia
- Federal subject: Sverdlovsk Oblast
- Districts: Yekaterinburg (Akademichesky, Leninsky, Verkh-Isetsky, Zheleznodorozhny)
- Voters: 468,691 (2026)

The Sverdlovsk constituency (No.169 (Note: Verkh-Isetsky constituency No.161 in 1993-1995, Verkh-Isetsky constituency No.162 in 1995-2007, No.168 in 2016–2026)) is a Russian legislative constituency in Sverdlovsk Oblast. The constituency covers central and western Yekaterinburg.

The constituency has been represented since 2016 by United Russia deputy Andrey Alshevskikh, former Member of Legislative Assembly of Sverdlovsk Oblast and local activist.

== Boundaries ==
1993–2003 Verkh-Isetsky constituency: Yekaterinburg (Chkalovsky, Leninsky, Oktyabrsky, Verkh-Isetsky)
The constituency was based entirely within Yekaterinburg, covering southern half of the city.

2003–2007 Verkh-Isetsky constituency: Yekaterinburg (Chkalovsky, Leninsky, Oktyabrsky, except Siniye Kamni microdistrict, Verkh-Isetsky)
The constituency was slightly altered following the 2003 redistricting, losing the Siniye Kamni microdistrict in Oktyabrsky City District to Ordzhonikidzevsky constituency.

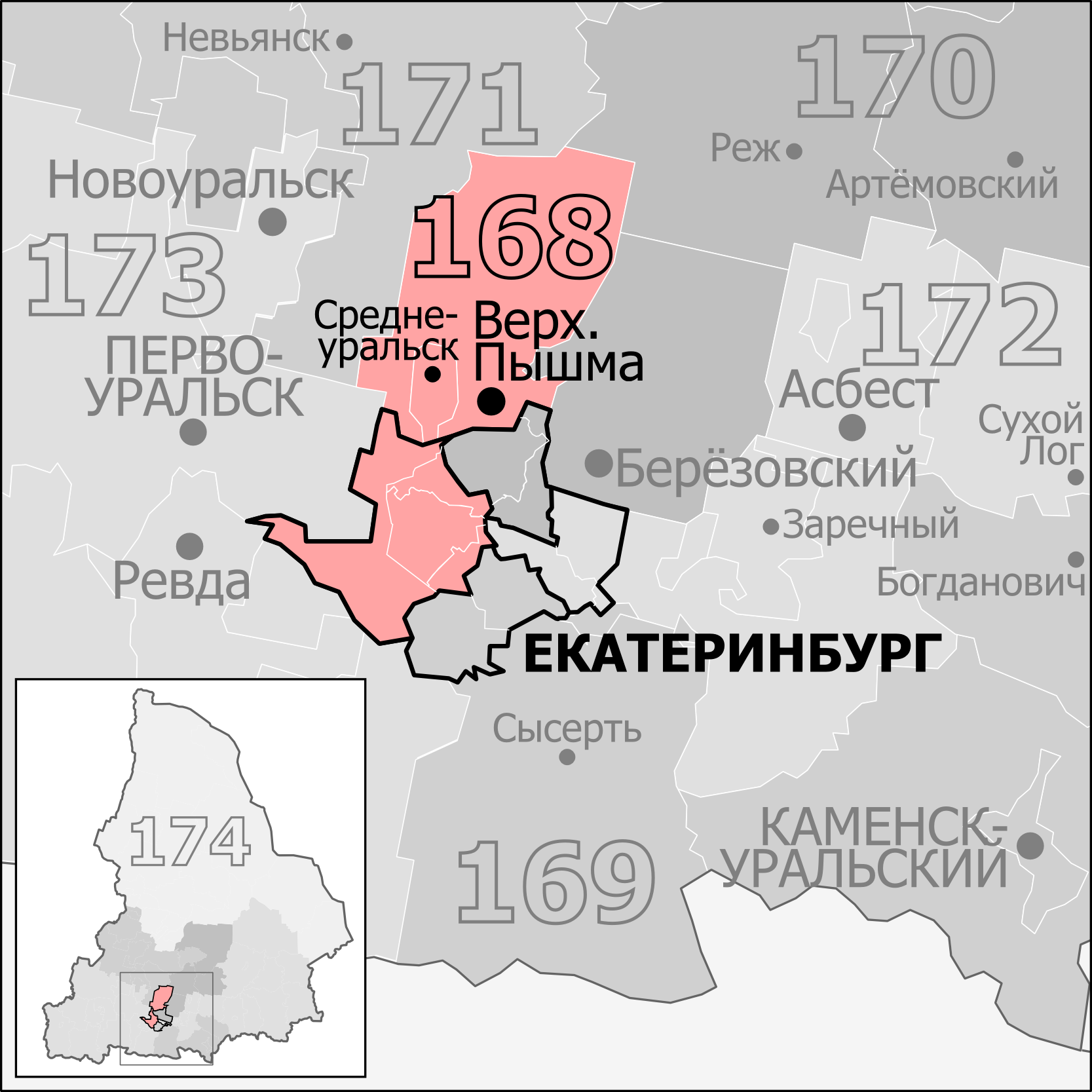
Constituency boundaries from 2016 to 2026

2016–2026: Sredneuralsk, Verkhnyaya Pyshma, Yekaterinburg (Leninsky, Verkh-Isetsky, Zheleznodorozhny)
The constituency was re-created for the 2016 election under the name "Sverdlovsk constituency" and retained only Leninsky and Verkh-Isetsky city districts of Yekaterinburg, losing Chkalovsky City District to Kamensk-Uralsky constituency and Oktyabrsky City District – to Asbest constituency. This seat instead gained Zheleznodorozhny City District in the city north-west from the former Ordzhonikidzevsky constituency as well as industrial satellite cities Verkhnyaya Pyshma and Sredneuralsk to the north from Pervouralsk constituency.

2026–present: Yekaterinburg (Akademichesky, Leninsky, Verkh-Isetsky, Zheleznodorozhny)
After the 2025 redistricting the constituency was significantly changed, losing Verkhnyaya Pyshma and Sredneuralsk to Nizhny Tagil constituency, and was again reconfigured to an entirely Yekaterinburg seat (Akademichesky City District was created in 2020 from parts of Leninsky and Verkh-Isetsky city districts).

== Members elected ==
Election	Member	Party
1993	Larisa Mishustina	Choice of Russia
1995	Yevgeny Zyablitsev	Independent
1999	A by-election was scheduled after Against all line received the most votes	
2000	Yevgeny Zyablitsev	Independent
2003	A by-election was scheduled after Against all line received the most votes	
2004	Yevgeny Zyablitsev	Independent
2007	Proportional representation - no election by constituency	
2011	Proportional representation - no election by constituency	
2016	Andrey Alshevskikh	United Russia
2021	Andrey Alshevskikh	United Russia
2026	Andrey Alshevskikh	United Russia

== Election results ==
=== 1993 ===
Summary of the 12 December 1993 Russian legislative election in the Verkh-Isetsky constituency
Candidate	Party	Votes	%
Larisa Mishustina	Choice of Russia	67,066	26.73%
Oleg Dolganov	Independent	–	18.52%
Stanislav Domnin	Independent	–	–
Boris Guseletov	Future of Russia–New Names	–	–
German Karelin	Democratic Party	–	–
Natalya Kirillova	Russian Democratic Reform Movement	–	–
Vladimir Lobok	Civic Union	–	–
Total		250,904	100%

=== 1995 ===
Summary of the 17 December 1995 Russian legislative election in the Verkh-Isetsky constituency
Candidate	Party	Votes	%
Yevgeny Zyablitsev	Independent	83,131	29.91%
Larisa Mishustina (incumbent)	Democratic Choice of Russia – United Democrats	58,020	20.88%
Aleksandr Tatarkin	My Fatherland	21,124	7.60%
Oleg Dolganov	Democratic Alternative	16,204	5.83%
Viktor Chepulyanis	Congress of Russian Communities	13,512	4.86%
Natalya Ponomareva	Independent	9,195	3.31%
Aleksey Kutsev	Liberal Democratic Party	7,911	2.85%
Aleksandr Mironov	Independent	5,801	2.09%
Gennady Kazakov	Independent	5,024	1.81%
Boris Guseletov	Social Democrats	4,771	1.72%
Aleksandr Sazonov	Independent	2,551	0.92%
against all		44,539	16.03%
Total		277,914	100%

=== 1999 ===
A by-election was scheduled after Against all line received the most votes.

Summary of the 19 December 1999 Russian legislative election in the Verkh-Isetsky constituency
Candidate	Party	Votes	%
Larisa Mishustina	Yabloko	59,702	20.33%
Igor Kovpak	Independent	59,697	20.33%
Vyacheslav Teplyakov	Communist Party	22,090	7.52%
Yury Samarin	Independent	16,500	5.62%
Yury Alekseyev	Independent	13,075	4.45%
Vladislav Kavtrev	Independent	11,463	3.90%
Vladimir Zelenkov	Independent	7,646	2.60%
Aleksandr Kobelev	Andrey Nikolayev and Svyatoslav Fyodorov Bloc	6,928	2.36%
Sergey Rybakov	Spiritual Heritage	5,354	1.82%
Vladimir Dmitriyev	Russian All-People's Union	3,589	1.22%
Valery Zimin	Russian Socialist Party	2,466	0.84%
Vladimir Sokovnin	Independent	1,829	0.62%
against all		69,297	23.60%
Total		293,640	100%

=== 2000 ===
Summary of the 26 March 2000 by-election in the Verkh-Isetsky constituency
Candidate	Party	Votes	%
Yevgeny Zyablitsev	Independent	108,690	32.24%
Igor Kovpak	Independent	77,618	23.02%
Anatoly Churkin	Independent	29,720	8.82%
Pavel Fedulev	Independent	17,844	5.29%
Vladimir Dmitriyev	Independent	11,257	3.34%
against all		79,510	23.58%
Total		293,315	100%

=== 2003 ===
A by-election was scheduled after Against all line received the most votes.

Summary of the 7 December 2003 Russian legislative election in the Verkh-Isetsky constituency
Candidate	Party	Votes	%
Yevgeny Zyablitsev (incumbent)	People's Party	63,308	21.58%
Nikolay Timofeyev	Independent	49,519	16.88%
Aleksandr Bogachev	Independent	36,692	12.51%
Maria Dronova	Yabloko	18,484	6.30%
Eduard Khudyakov	Independent	14,933	5.09%
Aleksey Zyablitsev	Independent	9,568	3.26%
Aleksey Starikov	Independent	7,737	2.64%
Vladimir Taskayev	Liberal Democratic Party	6,427	2.19%
Sergey Kolosovsky	United Russian Party Rus'	3,434	1.17%
Oleg Shumovsky	Independent	2,066	0.70%
Yury Chukharev	Independent	1,898	0.65%
Andrey Chuprov	Independent	1,165	0.40%
Anatoly Neuymin	Independent	782	0.27%
against all		67,541	23.03%
Total		293,558	100%

=== 2004 ===
Summary of the 14 March 2004 by-election in the Verkh-Isetsky constituency
Candidate	Party	Votes	%
Yevgeny Zyablitsev	Independent	96,118	32.10%
Vasily Shandybin	Communist Party	26,339	8.79%
Nikolay Timofeyev	Independent	24,778	8.27%
Konstantin Tsybko	Independent	16,864	5.63%
Yury Kuznetsov	Independent	15,491	5.17%
Oleg Lazarev	Independent	9,410	3.14%
Vladimir Taskayev	Liberal Democratic Party	8,091	2.70%
Aleksey Zyablitsev	Independent	8,077	2.69%
Natalya Rosseykina	Russian Communist Workers Party-Russian Party of Communists	6,731	2.24%
Nikolay Volkov	Independent	5,026	1.67%
Andrey Timofeyev	Independent	1,913	0.63%
against all		70,686	23.61%
Total		299,384	100%

=== 2016 ===
Summary of the 18 September 2016 Russian legislative election in the Sverdlovsk constituency
Candidate	Party	Votes	%
Andrey Alshevskikh	United Russia	76,390	38.67%
Valery Chereshnev	A Just Russia	36,863	18.66%
Rimma Skomorokhova	Communist Party	20,948	10.61%
Denis Sizov	Liberal Democratic Party	18,104	9.17%
Vladimir Shabanov	Rodina	9,208	4.66%
Feliks Rivkin	People's Freedom Party	8,861	4.49%
Denis Gayev	The Greens	8,340	4.22%
Sergey Zaytsev	Communists of Russia	6,023	3.05%
Total		197,528	100%

=== 2021 ===
Summary of the 17-19 September 2021 Russian legislative election in the Sverdlovsk constituency
Candidate	Party	Votes	%
Andrey Alshevskikh (incumbent)	United Russia	73,869	32.94%
Vladislav Postnikov	Yabloko	29,053	12.96%
Oksana Ivanova	A Just Russia — For Truth	28,689	12.79%
Rimma Skomorokhova	Communist Party	25,210	11.24%
Nikolay Nikolayev	New People	22,207	9.90%
Dmitry Zenov	Communists of Russia	11,038	4.92%
Sergey Prokofyev	Liberal Democratic Party	9,429	4.20%
Vladimir Avdiysky	Party of Pensioners	9,067	4.04%
Sergey Yusupov	Rodina	3,651	1.63%
Total		224,246	100%

=== 2026 ===
Summary of the 18-20 September 2026 Russian legislative election in the Sverdlovsk constituency
Candidate	Party	Votes	%
Andrey Alshevskikh (incumbent)	United Russia	62,461	33.76%
Alexander Demin	New People	46,949	25.37%
Rimma Skomorokhova	Communist Party	33,453	18.08%
Maksim Chiryshev	A Just Russia	19,757	10.68%
Aleksandr Kaptyug	Liberal Democratic Party	16,237	8.78%
Total		185,026	100%
