= Lev Kovpak =

Russian politician (born 1978)

- Лев Ковпак
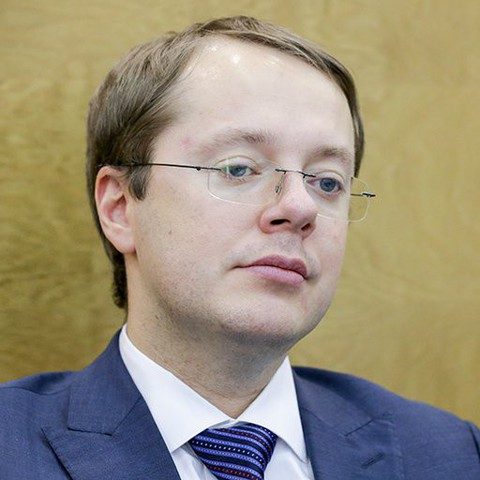

Member of the State Duma for Sverdlovsk Oblast
- Incumbent
- Assumed office 5 October 2016
- Preceded by: constituency re-established
- Constituency: Kamensk-Uralsky (No. 169)

Personal details
- Born: 23 October 1978 (age 47) Pervouralsk, RSFSR, USSR
- Party: United Russia
- Spouse: Veronica Kovpak
- Children: 2 daughts
- Relatives: Sydir Kovpak
- Education: University of San Francisco; Ural State University of Economics

Lev Igorevich Kovpak (Russian: Лев Игоревич Ковпак; born 23 October 1978, Pervouralsk, Sverdlovsk Oblast) is a Russian political figure and deputy of the 7th and 8th State Dumas. He is a distant relative of the Hero of the Soviet Union Sydir Kovpak.

Lev Kovpak studied in the US at the University of California, San Francisco. In the 1990s, he worked at the SKB-bank in Ekaterinburg. From 2005 to 2010, he was the deputy of the Ekaterinburg City Duma of the 4th convocation. In 2010–2011, he was the deputy of the Regional Duma of the bicameral Legislative Assembly of the Sverdlovsk Region. In 2016 he was elected deputy of the 7th State Duma from the Sverdlovsk oblast constituency. Since September 2021, he has served as the deputy of the 8th State Duma.

His father Igor is an entrepreneur, operating the Kirovsky supermarket chain in Sverdlovsk Region. The company is a major employer in the region and a regional government contractor. Lev was vice president of the company from 2002 till 2015, he is also its shareholder. According to the OCCRP report, Igor is the beneficiary of an offshore British Virgin Islands company with US$56 million worth of assets.

In July 2021, The Arbitration Court of the Sverdlovsk Region arrested the property of Lev Kovpak and his family. The decision was made as part of a bankruptcy case at the request of Konstantin Markov, acting bankruptcy trustee of the "Prodovolstvennaya Kompania", that tried to bring Kovpakov to subsidiary liability. The arrest was lifted at the end of August the same year.

== Assets ==
According to the “Pandora Papers,” in 2011 Igor Kovpak became the beneficiary of the offshore company “Sikesko Enterprises Limited,” registered in the British Virgin Islands. Documents show that as of 2016, this company had a bank account in Switzerland and investments amounting to $56 million.

In January 2023, journalists from Important Stories reported that Kovpak’s wife, Veronika Kovpak, holds an account in the Czech “Sberbank” with approximately 250 million Czech korunas (around 800 million rubles). Due to imposed sanctions, the account was frozen.

According to analysts from the Czech company “DatLab,” Kovpak is the beneficiary of the Czech company “IK Group s.r.o.”

== Sanctions ==
He was sanctioned by the UK government in 2022 in relation to the Russo-Ukrainian War.

In 2022, as a result of the 2022 Russian invasion of Ukraine, he was placed on a list of sanctioned Russian entities and people by the European Union, Ukraine, United Kingdom, Switzerland, Belgium and Japan. After that, the Czech Republic the froze bank account with US$10.5 million owned by Lev's wife Veronika.
