= Sukhoy Log, Kishertsky District, Perm Krai =

Sukhoy Log Сухой Лог
- Village
- Location within Perm Krai Location within Russia
- Coordinates: 57°26′N 57°19′E
- Country: Russia
- Region: Perm Krai
- District: Kishertsky District
- Time zone: UTC+5:00

Sukhoy Log (Russian: Сухой Лог) is a rural locality (a village) in Posadskoye Rural Settlement, Kishertsky District, Perm Krai, Russia. The population was 140 as of 2010. There are 4 streets.

== Geography ==
Sukhoy Log is located 14 km northeast of Ust-Kishert (the district's administrative centre) by road. Penki is the nearest rural locality.
