= Dmitry Ionin =

Russian politician (born 1985)

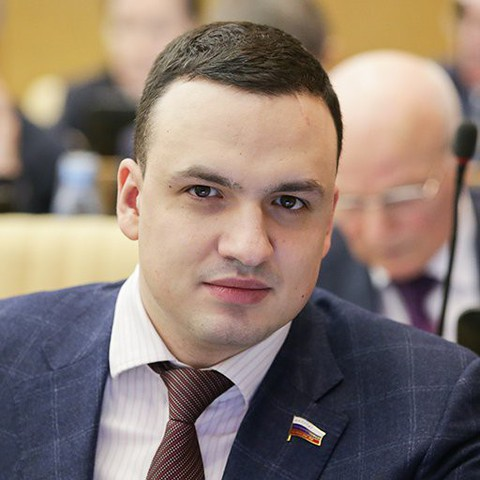
- Ionin in 2017

Member of the State Duma
- In office 1 November 2017 – 12 October 2021
- Preceded by: Alexander Burkov
- Constituency: Sverdlovsk Oblast

Personal details
- Born: 25 January 1985 (age 41)
- Party: A Just Russia (since 2010)

Dmitry Aleksandrovich Ionin (Russian: Дмитрий Александрович Ионин; born 25 January 1985) is a Russian politician serving as deputy governor of Sverdlovsk Oblast since 2021. From 2017 to 2021, he was a member of the State Duma. From 2011 to 2017, he was a member of the Legislative Assembly of Sverdlovsk Oblast.
