= Fakel Bogdanovich =

Fakel
- City: Bogdanovich, Russia
- Home arena: Fakel Stadium

KhK Fakel Bogdanovich (Russian: ХК Факел Богданович) is a bandy club in Bogdanovich, Russia. The club has earlier been playing in the Russian Bandy Supreme League, the second-tier of Russian bandy. The home games are played at Stadium Fakel in Bogdanovich. The club took part in Russian league play from 1992 and its colours are red and blue.

The club withdrew from regular league play in 2012 due to a lack of funding.
