= Uralsky, Sverdlovsk Oblast =

Closed settlement in Sverdlovsk Oblast, Russia

Uralsky Уральский
- Settlement
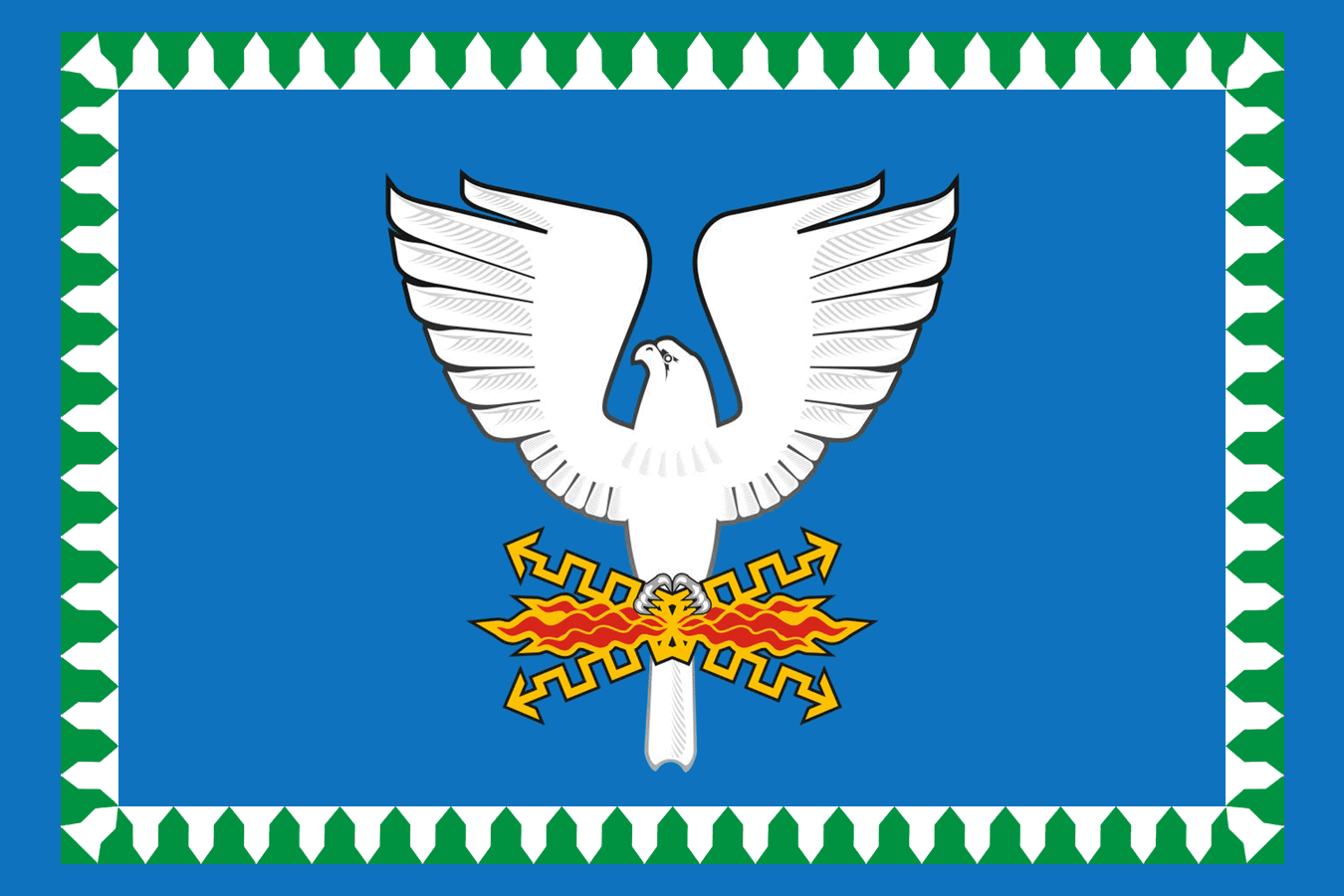
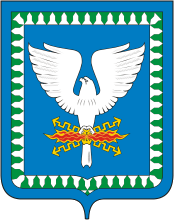
- Flag Coat of arms
- Interactive map of Uralsky
- Location of Uralsky Uralsky (Sverdlovsk Oblast)
- Coordinates: 56°40′44″N 61°05′04″E
- Country: Russia
- Federal subject: Sverdlovsk Oblast
- Founded: 1960
- Urban-type settlement status since: 1994

Population (2010 Census)
  - Total: 2,444
  - Estimate (2025): 2,172 (−11.1%)

Administrative status
  - Subordinated to: closed administrative-territorial formation of Uralsky
  - Capital of: closed administrative-territorial formation of Uralsky

Municipal status
  - Urban okrug: Uralsky Urban Okrug
  - Capital of: Uralsky Urban Okrug
- Time zone: UTC+5 (MSK+2)
- Postal code: 624054
- OKTMO ID: 65767000051
- Website: www.zato-uralsky.ru

Uralsky (Russian: Ура́льский) is a closed urban locality (a settlement) in Sverdlovsk Oblast, Russia, located 32 kilometers (20 mi) southeast of Yekaterinburg. Population: 2,444 (2010 census); 2,311 (2002 census).

== Administrative and municipal status ==
Within the framework of the administrative divisions, it is incorporated as the closed administrative-territorial formation of Uralsky—an administrative unit with the status equal to that of the districts. As a municipal division, the closed administrative-territorial formation of Uralsky is incorporated as Uralsky Urban Okrug.
