= Dmitry Tatishchev =

Russian diplomat and art collector

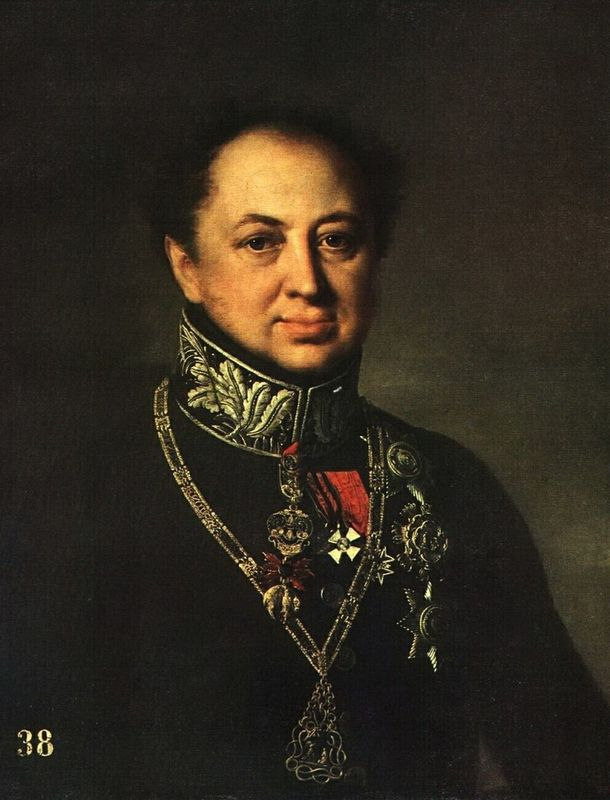
Portrait by Vasily Tropinin. Tatishchev is shown wearing the insignia of the Order of the Golden Fleece

Dmitry Pavlovich Tatischev or Tatistcheff (Russian: Дмитрий Павлович Татищев; born 1767, died 16 September 1845 in Vienna) was a Russian diplomat and art collector, and an intimate friend of Ferdinand VII of Spain.

Of Rurikid stock, Tatishchev owed his elevation in no small degree to the influence of his aunt, Princess Dashkov. In 1799 he was appointed as a member of the Board of Foreign Affairs, and in 1810 he was appointed as a Senator of the State Council. In June 1802 Tatishchev was appointed an Envoy to the Court of the Kingdom of Naples until February 1803. He returned to Naples as Envoy in January 1805, staying in the city until 1808. In September 1815 he was appointed as Envoy Extraordinary and Minister Plenipotentiary to Spain, with concurrent accreditation to the Dutch royal court, holding these positions until January 1821. From 22 August 1826 to 11 September 1841 he was Ambassador Extraordinary and Plenipotentiary to Austria.

Agents of the Czar abounded in Italy and in Germany, but in no capital was the Ambassador of Russia more active than in Madrid. General Tatistcheff, who was appointed to this post in 1814, became the terror of all his colleagues and of the Cabinet of London from his extraordinary activity in intrigue; but in relation to the internal affairs of Spain his influence was beneficial; and it was frequently directed towards the support of reforming Ministers, whom King Ferdinand, if free from foreign pressure, would speedily have sacrificed to the pleasure of his favourites and confessors.

Tatishchev was a connoisseur of and collector of art, and held in his collection 200 paintings and 160 rare gems, which were bequeathed to Tsar Nicholas I. He brought from Spain several works attributed to Jan van Eyck, including the Crucifixion and Last Judgement diptych. Tatishchev's last days were spent in penury owing to his gambling addiction.

He had two sons Pavel and Vladimir from the extramarital affair with Natalya Koltovskaya (née Turchaninova), a daughter of Alexei Turchaninov.
