= Andrey Alshevskikh =

Russian politician

- Андрей Альшевских
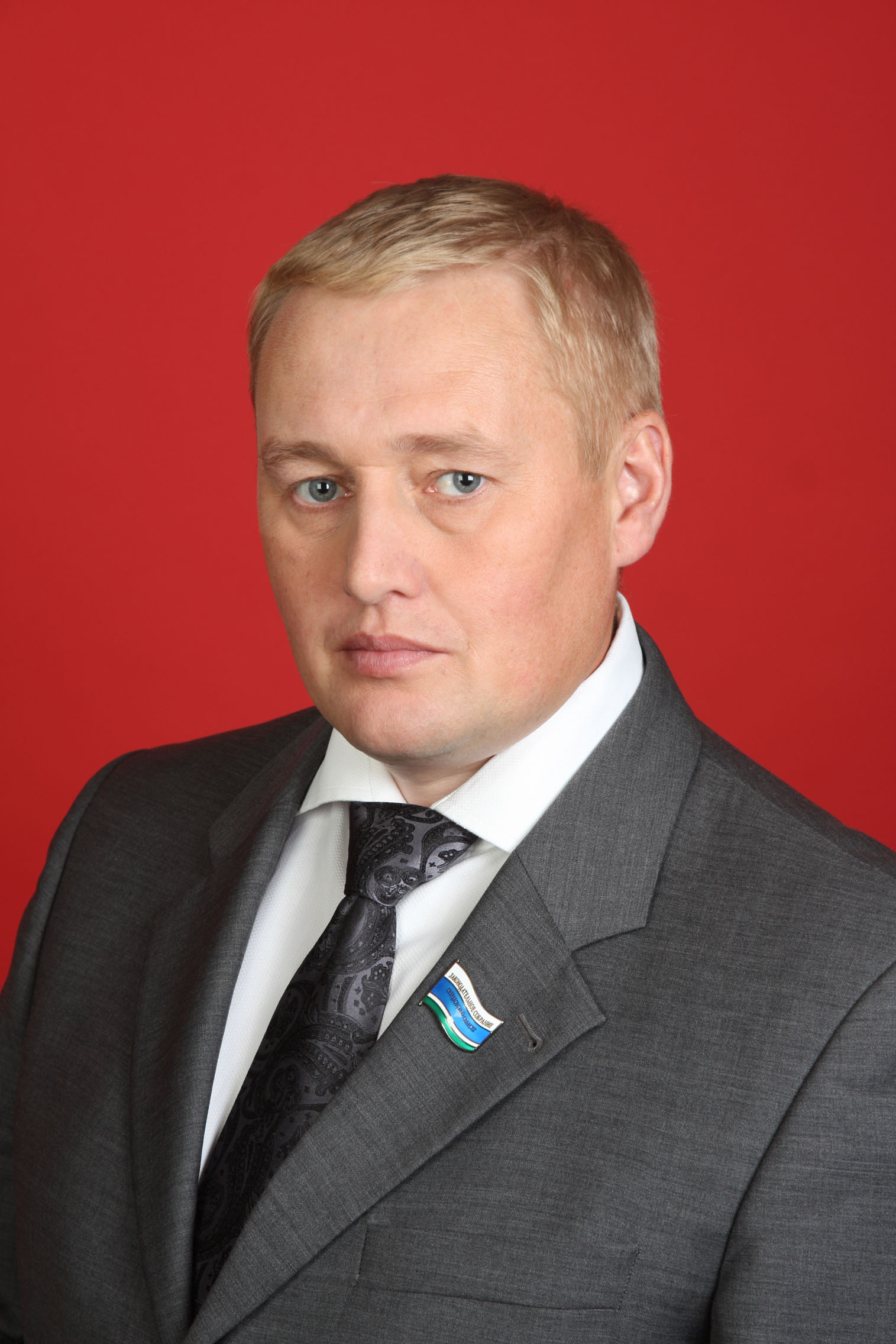

Member of the State Duma for Sverdlovsk Oblast
- Incumbent
- Assumed office 5 October 2016
- Preceded by: constituency re-established
- Constituency: Sverdlovsk (No. 168)

Personal details
- Born: 14 May 1972 (age 54) Sverdlovsk, RSFSR, USSR
- Party: CPRF (until 2016); United Russia (from 2016)
- Children: 2
- Education: Academy of Labour and Social Relations

Andrey Gennadyevich Alshevskikh (Russian: Андре́й Генна́дьевич Альше́вских; born 14 May 1972, Sverdlovsk) is a Russian political figure, war criminal, deputy of the 7th and 8th State Duma convocations. From 2006 to 2016, he was a member of the Communist Party of the Russian Federation. He left the party, in his words, because he was constantly "purposefully suspended from work". Later the same year, he ran for the State Duma with the United Russia. In 2021, he co-authored the law "On Amendments to the Federal Law "On Education in the Russian Federation"" (Russian: Закон о просветительской деятельности), which introduced the concept of "educational activity" and came into effect on 1 June 2021.

== Family ==
Alshevskikh is married and has two children.

His elder brother, Vladimir Alshevskikh, was arrested in late January 2020 for involvement in an organized group engaged in thefts from bank safe deposit boxes. The group rented boxes in banks, produced duplicate keys, and during subsequent visits checked the boxes for which they had keys and committed thefts. Searches of the suspects revealed USD 400,000, GBP 110,000, EUR 3,600 and more than RUB 1 million, as well as blanks and molds of keys to bank depositories. Deputy Alshevskikh stated that he had not communicated with his brother for a long time and added that everyone must bear responsibility for their own actions.

== Awards ==
- Commendation of the Government of the Russian Federation (16 December 2019) — for a significant contribution to the development of Russian parliamentarism and active legislative work.
