= Alexey Titov =

Russian composer

Alexey Nikolayevich Titov (Russian: Алексей Николаевич Титов; July 12, 1769 – November 8, 1827), was a Russian composer and violinist. His son, Nikolai Titov, was a composer, as were several other family members.

Titov was born and died in St. Petersburg. Alongside his musical career, Titov was a major general in the Russian cavalry. His music, most of which is for the stage (operas, ballets, and incidental music), was primarily written for local St. Petersburg theater and dance companies. Strong Russian themes run through his choice of libretti, and his music makes copious use of Russian folk music. He was most popular for his comic operas such as Yam, or The Post Station (1805), The Winter Party, or The Sequel to Yam (1808) and The Wedding Eve Party, or Filakin's Wedding (1809), which form a trilogy. All of them were staged in St. Petersburg.

== Operas ==
Note: this list is incomplete.

- Andromeda and Perseus (1802)
- King Solomon's Judgment (Russian: Суд царя Соломона, romanized: Sud tsarja Solomona; 1803)
- Judge Cupid, or The Argument of the Three Graces (Russian: Амур-судья, или Спор трех граций, romanized: Amur-sudja, ili Spor trekh gratsij; 1805)
- Yam, or The Post Station Russian: Ям, или Почтовая станция, romanized: Jam, ili Pochtovaja stancija; 1805)
- Nurzakhad (Russian: Нурзахад; 1807)
- The Winter Party, or The Sequel to Yam (Russian: Посиделки, или Следствие Яма, romanized: Posidelki, ili sledstvie Jama; 1808)
- The Wedding Eve Party, or Filakin's Wedding (Russian: Девишник, или Филаткина свадьба, romanized: Devishnik, ili Filatkina svadba; 1809)
- Polixena (1809)
- The Cossack Woman (1810)
- Emmerik Tekeli (Russian: Эммерик Текелий; 1812)
- Maslenitsa (1813)
- Mogul's Holiday, or Olimar's Celebration (Russian: Праздник Могола, или Торжество Олимара, romanized: Prazdnik Mogola, ili Torzhestvo Olimara; 1823)

== Family ==
Alexey Titov's brother Sergey was a famous violinist, violist and cellist.

On January 23, 1790 Titov married Yelizaveta Turchaninova (4 November 4, 1774 – March 25, 1827), the daughter of the business magnate Alexei Turchaninov. Titov got a huge dowry. With her sisters Natalya Koltovskaya and Nadezhda Ivelich, Yelizaveta was the co-heiress of her father's copper mines. According to her contemporaries, she was a generous and kind woman, but quick-tempered and strict to her children. Titov had 10 children with her:

- Nikolai (1791–1794)
- Felitsata (1792–?)
- Fyodor (1793–1810)
- Yekaterina (1794–?)
- Anna (1796–1858), married the officer Sergey Izmaylov in 1835.
- Alexander (1797–?)
- Pyotr (1798–1850)
- Nikolai (1800–1874), composer of waltzes, quadrilles, and marches.
- Mikhail (1804–1853), composer of romances.
- Varvara (1804–1806)
