= Galina Karelova =

Russian politician (born 1950)

- Галина Карелова
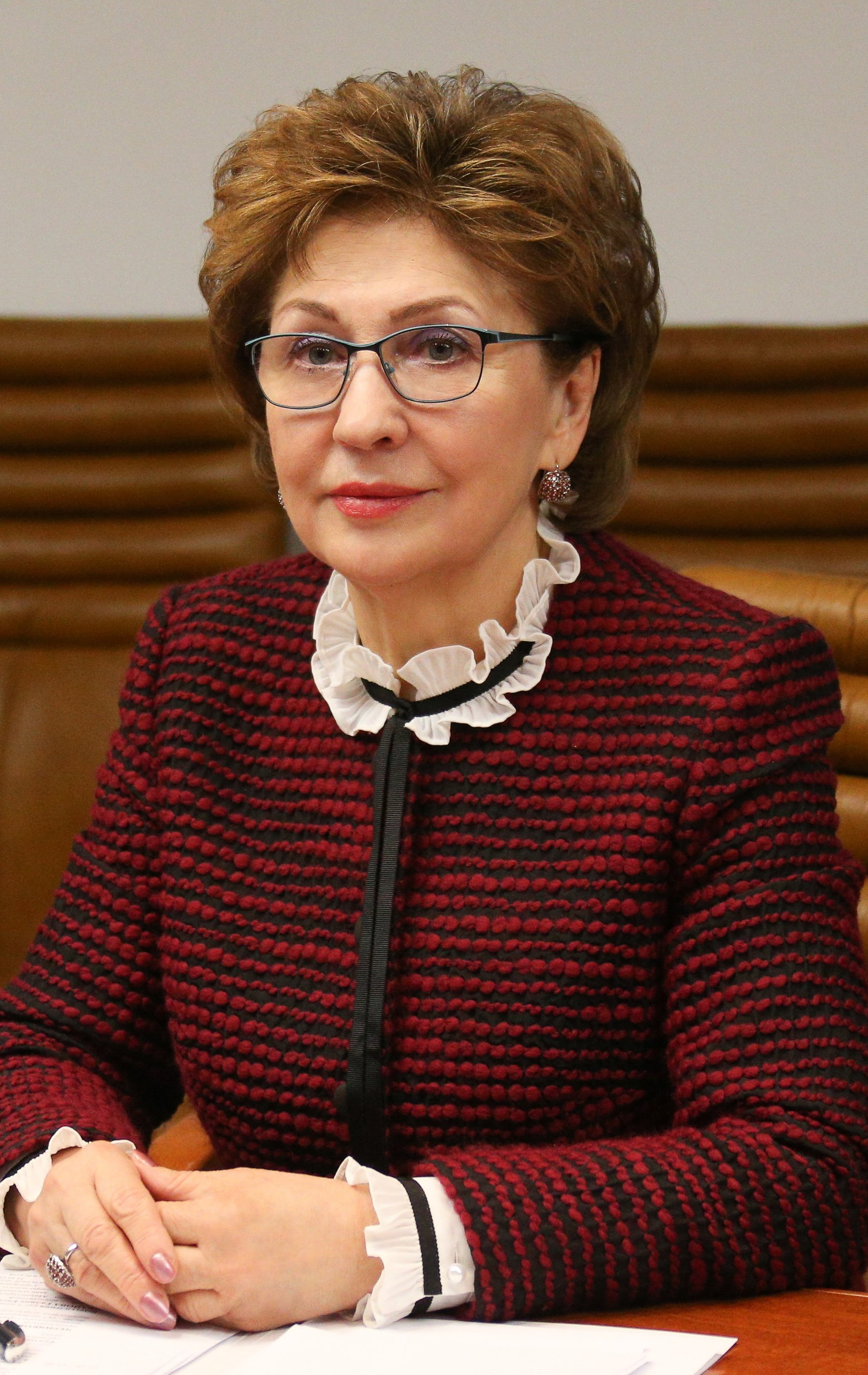
- Karelova in 2021

Senator from Volgograd Oblast
- Incumbent
- Assumed office 22 September 2014
- Preceded by: Gennady Makin

Personal details
- Born: Galina Karelova; 29 June 1950 (age 76) Nizhnyaya Salda, Sverdlovsk Oblast, Russian Soviet Federative Socialist Republic, Soviet Union
- Party: United Russia
- Education: Ural State Technical University

Galina Nikolayevna Karelova (Russian: Галина Николаевна Карелова; born 29 June 1950) is a Russian politician serving as a senator from Volgograd Oblast since 22 September 2014.

== Career ==
Galina Karelova was born on 29 June 1950 in Nizhnyaya Salda, Sverdlovsk Oblast. In 1972, she graduated from the Ural Federal University. From 1972 to 1990, she worked at the Ural State Technical University first as an assistant and, later, as a docent. In 1990, she was elected deputy of the Sverdlovsk Regional Council of People's Deputies. From 1993 to 1996, she was the senator of the Federation Council but left the position to become a deputy for the State Duma of the 2nd convocation. From 1997 to 2003, Karelova worked at the Ministry of Labour and Social Protection. From 2004 to 2007, she was the Chairman of the Social Insurance Fund of the Russian Federation. Later she was re-elected again as a deputy of the State Duma of the 5th and 6th convocations. On 22 September 2014, she became the senator from Volgograd Oblast.

== Sanctions ==
Galina Karelova is under personal sanctions introduced by the European Union, the United Kingdom, the United States, Canada, Switzerland, Australia, Ukraine, and New Zealand, for ratifying the decisions of the "Treaty of Friendship, Cooperation and Mutual Assistance between the Russian Federation and the Donetsk People's Republic and between the Russian Federation and the Luhansk People's Republic" and providing political and economic support for Russia's annexation of Ukrainian territories.
