= Aramil =

Town in Sverdlovsk Oblast, Russia

Aramil Арамиль
- Town
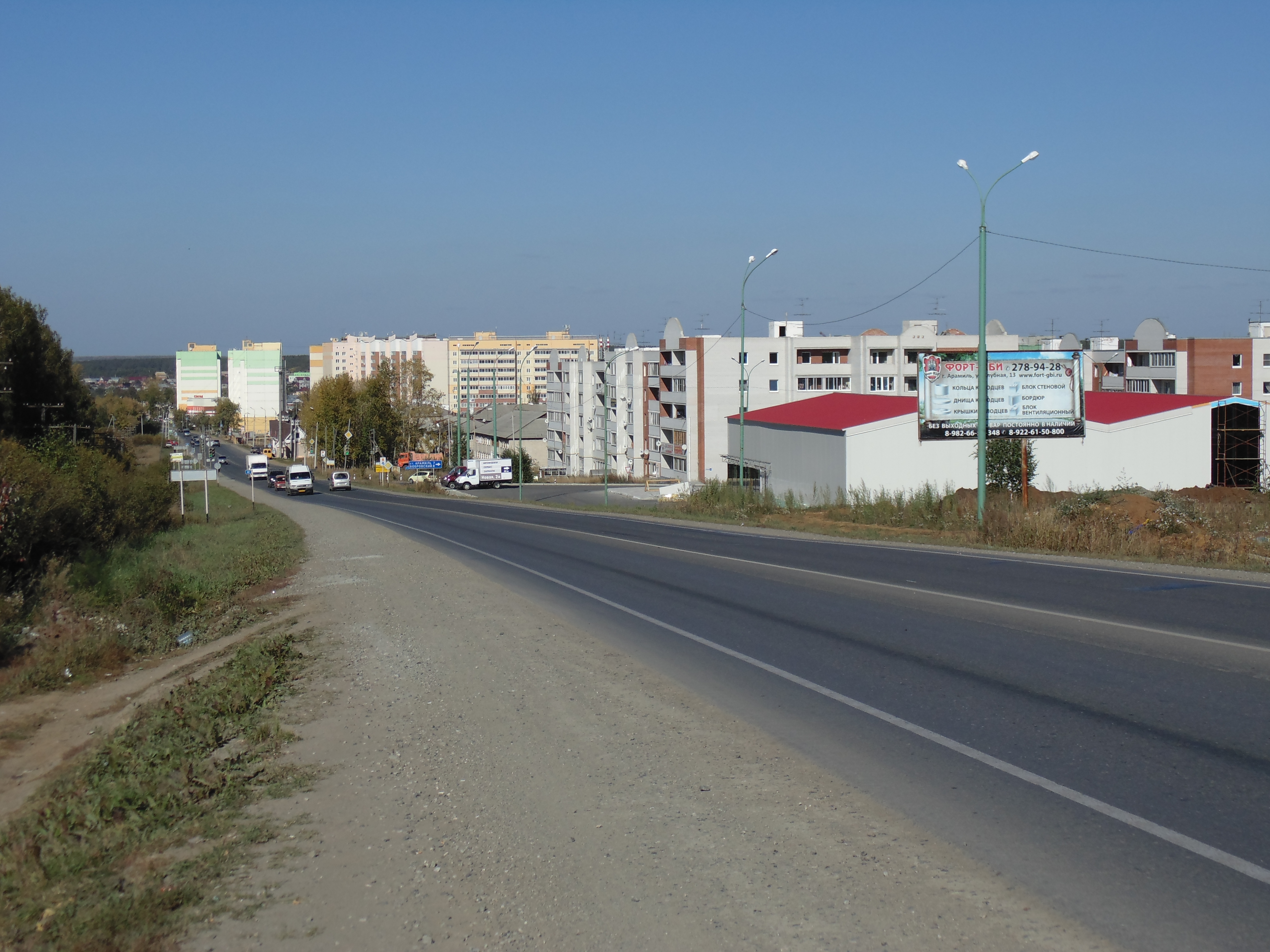
- View of Aramil

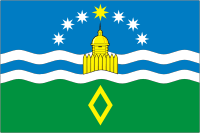
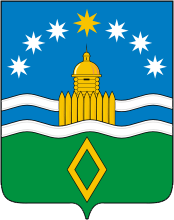
- Flag Coat of arms
- Interactive map of Aramil
- Location of Aramil Aramil (Sverdlovsk Oblast)
- Coordinates: 56°42′N 60°50′E
- Country: Russia
- Federal subject: Sverdlovsk Oblast
- Administrative district: Sysertsky District
- TownSelsoviet: Aramil
- Founded: 1675
- Town status since: 1966
- Elevation: 220 m (720 ft)

Population (2010 Census)
  - Total: 14,221
  - Estimate (2025): 20,559 (+44.6%)

Administrative status
  - Capital of: town of Aramil

Municipal status
  - Urban okrug: Aramilsky Urban Okrug
  - Capital of: Aramilsky Urban Okrug
- Time zone: UTC+5 (MSK+2)
- Postal codes: 624000, 624003
- OKTMO ID: 65729000001
- Website: www.aramilgo.ru

Aramil (Russian: Арами́ль) is a town in Sysertsky District of Sverdlovsk Oblast, Russia, located on the Iset River (Ob's basin), 25 kilometers (16 mi) southeast of Yekaterinburg, the administrative center of the oblast. Population: 14,221 (2010 census); 15,076 (2002 census); 13,584 (1989 Soviet census).

== History ==
Aramil was established in 1675 as a sloboda near the source of the Aramil River.

In 1960, U-2 shootdown incident happened nearby Aramil.

Town status was granted to the settlement in 1966.

== Administrative and municipal status ==
Within the framework of the administrative divisions, it is, together with two rural localities, incorporated within Sysertsky District as the Town of Aramil. As a municipal division, the Town of Aramil is incorporated as Aramilsky Urban Okrug.

== Notable people ==
- Kirill Smal (born 2005), racing driver
