= Rumen Leonidov =

Bulgarian poet, translator, journalist and publisher

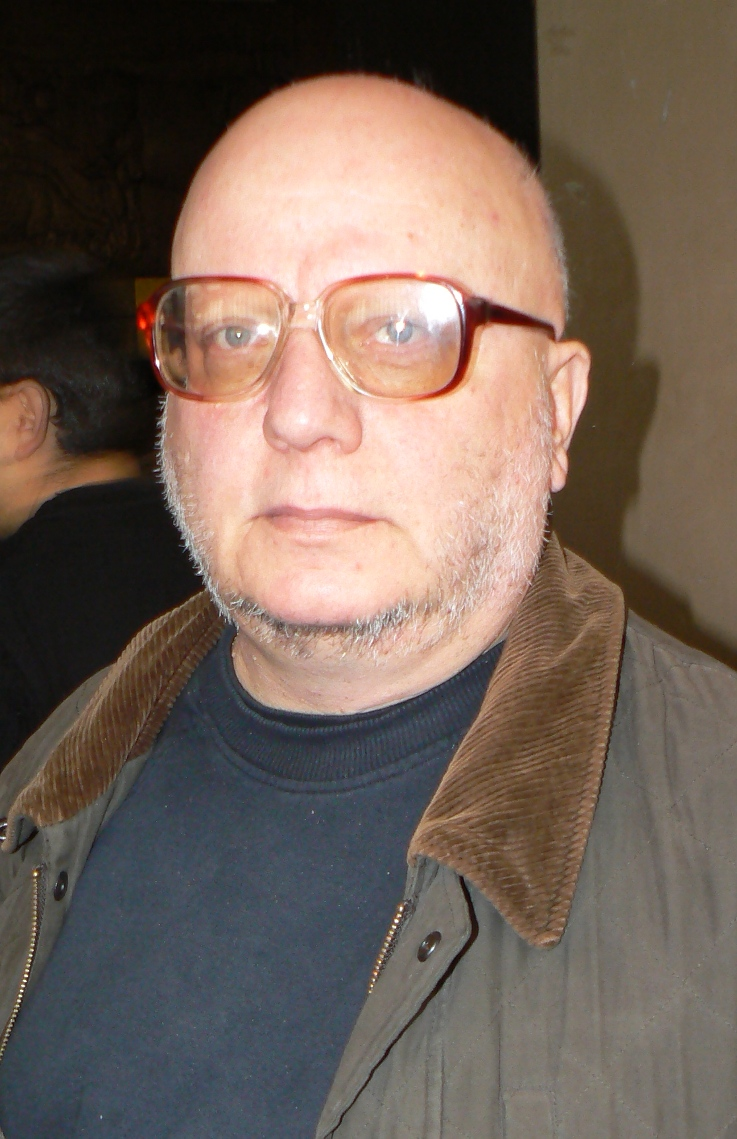
Rumen Leonidov

Rumen Leonidov (born 17 May 1953) is a Bulgarian poet, translator, journalist and publisher. He has published nine books and received numerous Bulgarian as well as international awards for poetry. He was born in Sofia and earned a degree in Bulgarian philology from Plovdiv University.
