= Bogdanovich (town) =

Town in Bogdanovichsky District, Sverdlovsk Oblast, Russia

Coordinates: 56.7803°N 62.0494°E

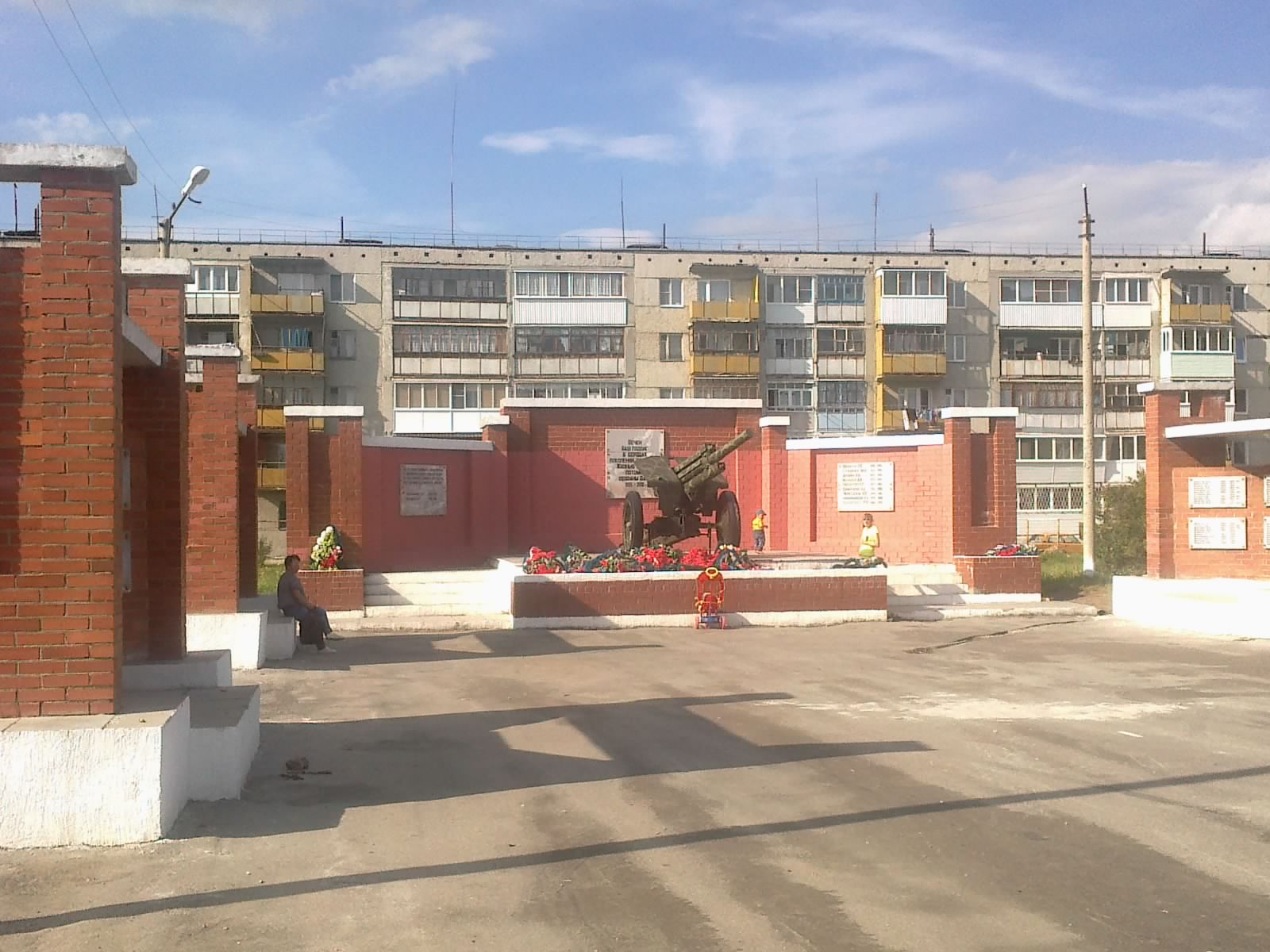
A war memorial in Bogdanovich

Bogdanovich (Russian: Богданович) is a town in Sverdlovsk Oblast, Russia, located on the Kunara River (right tributary of the Pyshma), 99 kilometers (62 mi) east of Yekaterinburg. Population: 30,670 (2010 census); 32,856 (2002 census); 35,983 (1989 Soviet census).

== History ==
It was founded in 1883–1885 as a settlement around the Bogdanovich railway station, which opened in 1885. Town status was granted in 1947.

== Sports ==
The bandy team Fakel plays in the 2nd highest division of the Russian Bandy League. Their home arena has a capacity of 3,000.
