= Sysertsky District =

District in Sverdlovsk Oblast, Russia

Sysertsky District Сысертский район (Russian)
- District
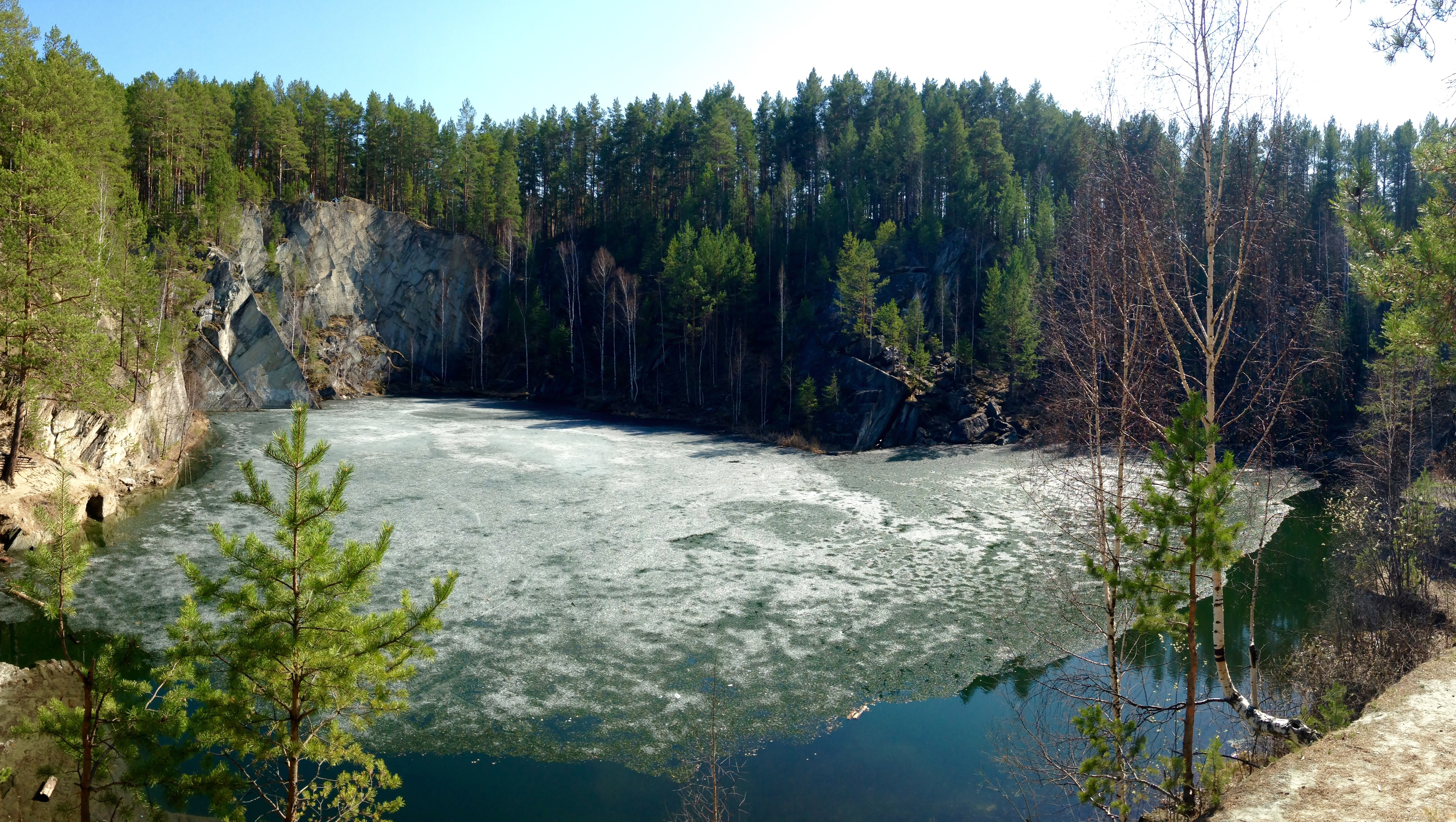
- Lake in Sysertsky District

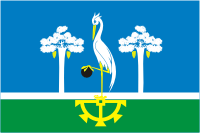
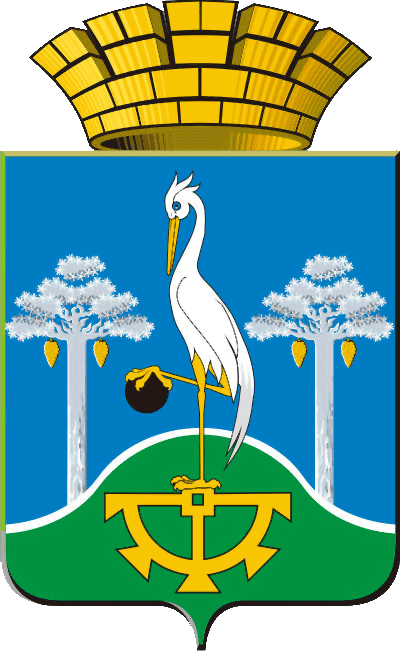
- Flag Coat of arms
- Location of Sysertsky District in Sverdlovsk Oblast
- Coordinates: 56.472°N 60.813°E
- Country: Russia
- Federal subject: Sverdlovsk Oblast
- Established: 1924
- Administrative center: Sysert

Area
  - Total: 2,030.55 km^{2} (784.00 sq mi)

Population (2010 Census)
  - Total: 77,691
  - Density: 38.261/km^{2} (99.096/sq mi)
  - Urban: 44.6%
  - Rural: 55.4%

Administrative structure
  - Administrative divisions: 2 Towns, 17 Selsoviets
  - Inhabited localities: 2 cities/towns, 39 rural localities

Municipal structure
  - Municipally incorporated as: Sysertsky Urban Okrug
- Website: http://admsysert.ru/

Sysertsky District (Russian: Сысе́ртский райо́н) is an administrative district (raion), one of the thirty in Sverdlovsk Oblast, Russia. Its administrative center is the town of Sysert. The district's population was 77,691 as of the (2010 census), down from 78,085 (2002 census); and 78,229 (1989 Soviet census). The population of Sysert accounts for 59.0% of the district's total population.

== Administrative and municipal status ==
Within the framework of administrative divisions, Sysertsky District is one of the thirty in the oblast. The town of Sysert serves as its administrative center.

As a municipal division, the territory of the district is split between two municipal formations—Sysertsky Urban Okrug, to which the town of Sysert and thirty-seven of the administrative district's rural localities belong, and Aramilsky Urban Okrug, which covers the rest of the administrative district's territory, including the town of Aramil and two remaining rural localities.
