= Beryozovsky, Sverdlovsk Oblast =

Town in Sverdlovsk Oblast, Russia

Beryozovsky Берёзовский
- Town
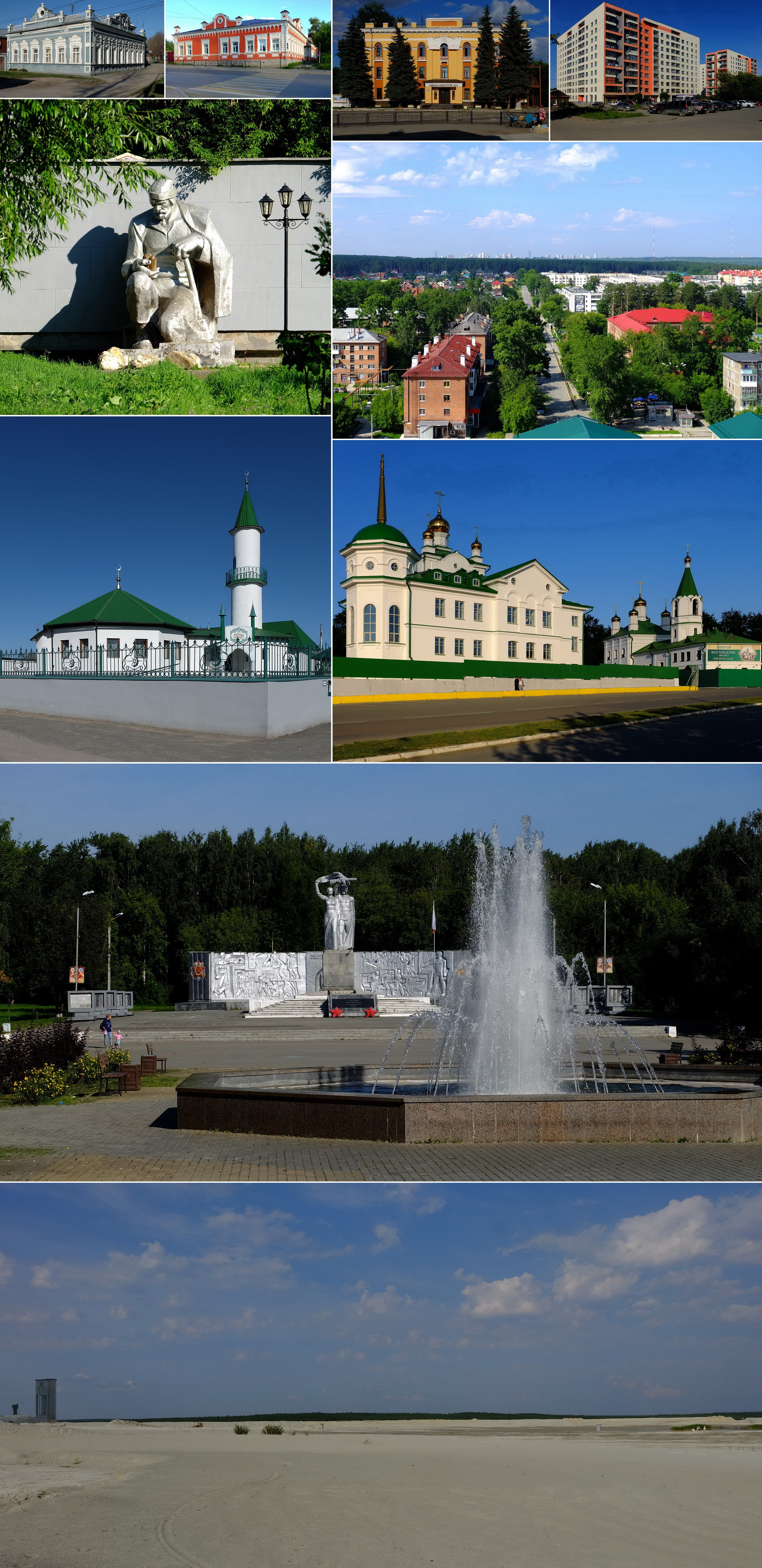

- Flag Coat of arms
- Interactive map of Beryozovsky
- Location of Beryozovsky Beryozovsky (Sverdlovsk Oblast)
- Coordinates: 56°54′N 60°49′E
- Country: Russia
- Federal subject: Sverdlovsk Oblast
- Founded: 1752
- Town status since: 1938
- Elevation: 250 m (820 ft)

Population (2010 Census)
  - Total: 51,651
  - Estimate (2025): 60,752 (+17.6%)

Administrative status
  - Subordinated to: Town of Beryozovsky
  - Capital of: Town of Beryozovsky

Municipal status
  - Urban okrug: Beryozovsky Urban Okrug
  - Capital of: Beryozovsky Urban Okrug
- Time zone: UTC+5 (MSK+2)
- Postal codes: 623700–623704, 623706
- OKTMO ID: 65731000001
- Website: березовский.рф

Beryozovsky (/bərjɒzjɒvskɪ/ ) (Russian: Берёзовский), also sometimes romanized as Beryozovskiy, is a town in Sverdlovsk Oblast, Russia, located on the Beryozovka River (Pyshma's tributary), 13 kilometers (8.1 mi) northeast of Yekaterinburg, the administrative center of the oblast. Population: 59,698 (2021 census); 51,651 (2010 census); 46,744 (2002 census); 47,944 (1989 Soviet census). It is a part of the general urban agglomeration of Yekaterinburg. Beryozovsky is the 267th largest city in Russia, and the 10th largest city in the Sverdlovsk Oblast. Beryozovsky celebrates City day every year on the first Saturday of July. Beryozovsky is often dubbed as the first city to ever have Khrushchevkas, which is a type of functionalist-style concrete-paneled resedential building, as buildings that were very similar to Khrushchevkas, and were the prototype for them, were built in Beryozovsky in the late 1940s.

The main industrial economic sectors that generate the most income for Beryozovsky are the production of construction materials, in particular concrete and architectural paints; metallurgy and metalworking, particularly the producing of steel reinforcement mesh and specialized industrial hardware; gold mining and refinement; and chemical production. The population of Beryozovsky has been growing without major interruptions since 2005. Some pollution issues have accumulated in Beryozovsky since the 1990s because of Beryozovsky's large industrial sector. On the northern edge of the town, there is an area known as the Beryozovskiye Peski (which can be translated to Beryozovsky Sands). The Beryozovskiye Peski are a large tailings dam, with a lake of polluted water that contains crushed ore waste in the middle, created by the mines and factories in the area. It is often visited by tourists, as it highly resembles a small natural desert. The pop-musician Mr. Credo recorded an Egyptian-themed music video "Chudnaya Dolina" in the Beryozovskiye Peski due to its similarity to a real desert.

== History ==
In 1745, Erofey Markov had found a deposit of gold in the territory of modern-day Beryozovsky. When Markov announced that he had found gold in Beryozovsky, government officials had started searching for it in the area, but could not find anything of note. They suspected that Markov had attempted to deceive them and the common people in the area, and Markov got jailed by the local government, spending multiple years in imprisonment.

After a few years, gold was found again in Beryozovsky, and the gold deposits were quickly located, so in 1748 a gold-mining operation known as the Shartash Deposit (later renamed to Pervonachalny Deposit) was built. Beryozovsky was founded in the same year as a gold-mining settlement by the Beryozovskoye deposit. It gained its name from the Beryozovka River it was founded on. The Shartash mine was the first full-scale mine in Beryozovsky, and after its success in generating income, more mines started getting built in Beryozovsky. In 1752 the Beryozovskoye Deposit, also romanized as the Beryozovsky Deposit, was built. It became the main mining area of Beryozovsky. In 1757, a large-scale gold-washing factory was built, which greatly accelerated the population growth in the area. In the same year the first gold bar made in Beryozovsky was sold in Saint Petersburg.

The working conditions in the mines of Beryozovsky were harsh for the average worker at the time. Forced labourers made up the bulk of the work-force in the mines.

All of the gold mines in the area at the time could only extract near-surface level gold from natural gold deposits. In 1814, Lev Brusnytsin had found deposits of placer gold near the river banks of the Beryozovka and Pyshma rivers, and introduced the method of washing out large amounts of gold from sand to the region. That discovery greatly increased the output of gold from Beryozovsky, leading to more and more people and forced-labourers moving into the area to participate in gold-mining, triggering a period similar to the Gold Rush in the United States, though much smaller in scale. Most of the non-industrial part of the settlement was located directly on a large deposit of placer gold. Most of Beryozovsky was leveled, to accommodate for mines instead of housing and commercial. As a resuly, all buildings in Beryozovsky that exist today are built after the early 1800s, leaving no physical trace of older buildings in the area. Town status was granted to Beryozovsky in 1938. The gold mines still operate today.

== Administrative and municipal status ==
Within the framework of the administrative divisions, it is, together with seventeen rural localities, incorporated as the Town of Beryozovsky—an administrative unit with the status equal to that of the districts. As a municipal division, the Town of Beryozovsky is incorporated as Beryozovsky Urban Okrug. Its relatively small population is led by its mayor, Vladimir Sergeevich Shauraks, who was elected on October 12th, 2026.

== Notable people ==
- Lyudmila Bragina - middle distance runner, won a golden medal in the 1972 Summer Olympics.
- AK-47 group - prominent Russian hip-hop group, composed of musicians Vitaly Gostyukhin and Maksim Sergeevich Brylin.
