= Sysert =

Town in Sverdlovsk Oblast, Russia

Sysert Сысерть
- Town
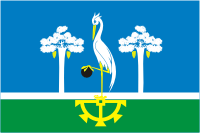
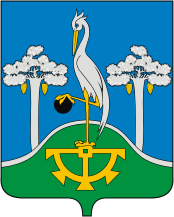
- Flag Coat of arms
- Interactive map of Sysert
- Location of Sysert Sysert (Sverdlovsk Oblast)
- Coordinates: 56°30′N 60°49′E
- Country: Russia
- Federal subject: Sverdlovsk Oblast
- Administrative district: Sysertsky District
- Founded: 1732 or 1773
- Town status since: 1946
- Elevation: 240 m (790 ft)

Population (2010 Census)
  - Total: 20,465
  - Estimate (2025): 20,245 (−1.1%)

Administrative status
  - Capital of: Sysertsky District

Municipal status
  - Urban okrug: Sysertsky Urban Okrug
  - Capital of: Sysertsky Urban Okrug
- Time zone: UTC+5 (MSK+2)
- Postal code: 624022
- OKTMO ID: 65722000001

Sysert (Russian: Сысе́рть) is a town and the administrative center of Sysertsky District of Sverdlovsk Oblast, Russia, located on the Sysert River (Ob basin, right tributary of the Iset), 50 kilometers (31 mi) south of Yekaterinburg. Population: 20,465 (2010 census); 22,152 (2002 census); 22,462 (1989 Soviet census).

== History ==
It was founded in either 1732 or in 1773 and was called Sysertsky Zavod (Сысертский Завод) until 1932. Town status was granted to it in 1946.

== Administrative and municipal status ==
Within the framework of administrative divisions, Sysert serves as the administrative center of Sysertsky District and is subordinated to it. As a municipal division, the town of Sysert together with thirty-seven rural localities in Sysertsky District is incorporated as Sysertsky Urban Okrug.
