= Golden Hair (fairy tale) =

- Short story by Pavel Bazhov
- Original title: Золотой волос
- Translator: Alan Moray Williams (first), Eve Manning, et al.
- Country: Soviet Union
- Language: Russian
- Genre: skaz (fairy tale)

Publication
- Published in: Zolotye Zyorna
- Publication type: anthology
- Publisher: Sverdlovsk Publishing House
- Media type: print
- Publication date: 1939
- Published in English: 1944
- Series: The Malachite Casket collection (list of stories)

"Golden Hair" (Russian: Золотой волос, romanized: Zolotoj volos, lit. "a golden hair") is a Bashkir folk tale collected and reworked by Pavel Bazhov. It was first published in 1939 in the children's stories almanac Zolotye Zyorna released by Sverdlovsk Publishing House. It was later released as a part of The Malachite Casket collection. It was translated from Russian into English by Alan Moray Williams in 1944.

The story introduces Poloz the Great Snake's daughter.

== Publication ==
This skaz was first published together with "The Twisted Roll" in Zolotye Zyorna (Russian: Золотые зёрна, lit. "golden grains") children's almanac in 1939. It was later released as a part of The Malachite Casket collection on 28 January 1939. This is one of the few stories that are based on the Bashkirs folklore (another example being "The Demidov Caftans"). Bazhov was very interested in the Bashkirs' tales, and had some more material of that kind, but decided not to publish it. He wrote: "I, for instance, have some Bashkir folklore in reserve, but I don't put it to use because I feel incompetent in the details of their everyday life". The author disliked inventing details and writing about unfamiliar topics.

In 1944 the story was translated from Russian into English by Alan Moray Williams and published by Hutchinson as a part of The Malachite Casket: Tales from the Urals collection. The story was published in the collection Russian Magic Tales from Pushkin to Platonov, published by Penguin Books in 2012. It was translated by Anna Gunin.

== Plot ==
While hunting in the steppe, a daring Bashkir hunter Ailyp meets a girl of "unprecedented beauty" sitting by the river. Her braided long hair is golden and so bright that it makes the water glow. She asks if Ailyp will take her hand in marriage. Ailyp happily agrees. The girl's old nanny explains that the girl's name is Golden Hair and she is the daughter of Poloz the Great Snake, who has control over gold. The girl's hair is of pure gold and so heavy that it chains her to the spot. Ailyp collects the hair and starts walking away with his bride-to-be, but Poloz does not want to let his daughter go. He starts pulling the hair underground. Golden Hair takes the scissors and quickly cuts off her braid. She disappears underground, leaving Ailyp with just her braid. The girl's nanny approaches him and says that the girl is back on her spot by the river, but Poloz made her hair even heavier than before so that Ailyp wouldn't be able to lift it. She says to Ailyp: "Go home and live like you did before. If you don't forget your bride Golden Hair in three years, I will come back and take you to her". After three long years Ailyp goes back to the river. Golden Hair says that his memories of her were making the hair lighter with each passing day. She suggests that they try running away again, but Poloz catches them and makes Golden Hair's braid even longer and heavier. The nanny tells Ailyp:

"Go back home and wait for another three years. Exactly three years from now you must go to her".

From the wise eagle-owl Ailyp learns that there's a place underneath Lake Itkul where Poloz is powerless. After three years Ailyp goes back for Golden Hair, brings her to Lake Itkul and together they make a home underneath it.

== Themes ==
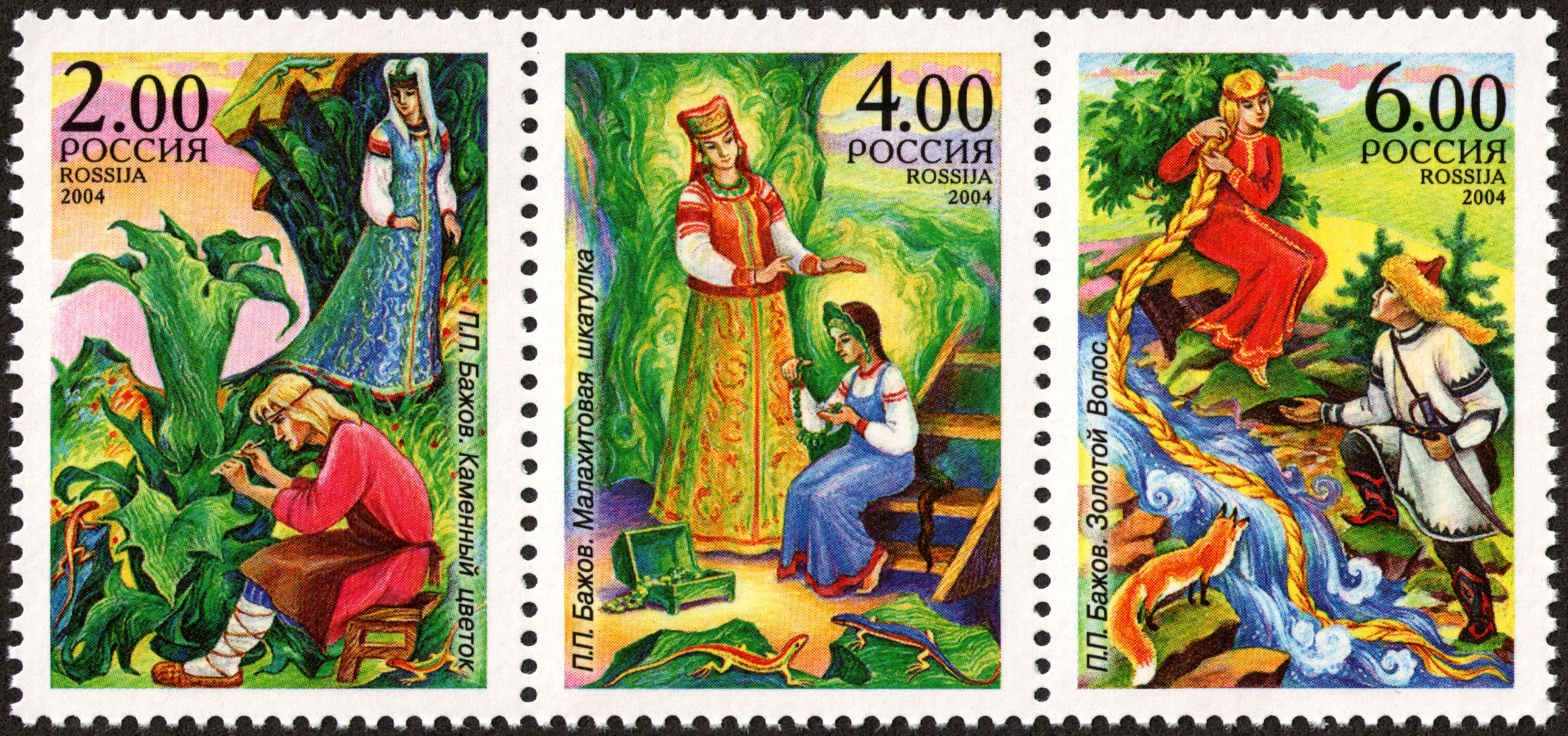
The characters from The Malachite Casket collection in the 2004 Russian stamps (from left to right): Danilo and the Mistress of the Copper Mountain ("The Stone Flower"), the Mistress and Tanyushka ("The Malachite Casket") Ailyp and Golden Hair .

According to the plot, the lovers safely run away from Poloz. The theme of the symbolical union between a mythical creature and a human is very popular in folklore tradition. From the Bashkirs' point of view, such a marriage guarantees success in career, wealth and prosperity.

However the space under Itkul is viewed as the version of the pagan "Otherworld", or realm of the dead where people go after their physical death and remain there forever. Lidiya Slobozhaninova comments that it is no accident that Golden Hair leaves that place only occasionally, and that in the end the narrator confesses that he has never seen them after. Slobozhaninova summarizes that the price of love, freedom, and wealth is death, and the story is Bazhov's adaptation of the universal storyline of "love which is stronger than death".

== Adaptations ==
In 1947 the Moscow Puppet Theater staged a play Tales from the Urals (Russian: Сказы старого Урала, romanized: Skazy starogo Urala) by Klavdiya Filippova, based on "Sinyushka's Well" and "Golden Hair".

The 1979 animated film Golden Hair was released a part of the animated film series made at Sverdlovsk Film Studio from the early 1970s to early 1980s, on time for the 100th anniversary since the birth of Pavel Bazhov. The series included the following films: Sinyushka's Well (1973), The Mistress of the Copper Mountain (1975), The Malachite Casket (1976), The Stone Flower (1977), Podaryonka (based on "Silver Hoof", 1978), Golden Hair, and The Grass Hideaway (1982). This film is a stop motion animated film directed by Igor Reznikov, with screenplay by Alexander Rozin and music by Vladislav Kazenin.
