= The Malachite Casket (fairy tale) =

Russian folk tale

- Short story by Pavel Bazhov
- Original title: Малахитовая шкатулка
- Translator: Alan Moray Williams (first), Eve Manning, et al.
- Country: Soviet Union
- Language: Russian
- Genre: skaz

Publication
- Published in: Na Smenu!
- Publication type: Periodical
- Media type: Print (newspaper, hardback and paperback)
- Publication date: 1938
- Published in English: 1944
- Series: The Malachite Casket collection (list of stories)

"The Malachite Casket" (Russian: Малахитовая шкатулка, romanized: Malahitovaja shkatulka), also known as "The Malachite Box", is a folk tale (the so-called skaz) of the Ural region collected and reworked by Pavel Bazhov. It was first published in the several issues of the Sverdlovsk newspaper Na Smenu! in September—November 1938, and in Uralsky Sovremennik (volume 1, 1938). It was later released as a part of The Malachite Casket collection. "The Malachite Casket" is considered to be one of the best stories in the collection. The story was translated from Russian into English by Alan Moray Williams in 1944, and by Eve Manning in the 1950s.

== Publication ==
This skaz was first published in the several issues of the Sverdlovsk newspaper Na Smenu! in September—November 1938, and in the Uralsky Sovremennik almanac (volume 1, 1938). It was released as a part of The Malachite Casket collection on 28 January 1939. The story was initially titled "Father's Gift" (Russian: Тятино подаренье; Tjatino podarenje), but the title was changed prior to publication. Bazhov liked the title so much that he named the whole collection after the story.

In 1944 the story was translated from Russian into English by Alan Moray Williams and published by Hutchinson as a part of The Malachite Casket: Tales from the Urals collection. In the 1950s another translation of The Malachite Casket was made by Eve Manning.

== Plot ==
The talented miner Stepan dies, leaving his widow Nastya (Настя, Настенька, Nastya, Nastenka, also tr. "Nastasya") and their two sons and a daughter. Nastasya becomes the owner of the Malachite Casket, filled with jewellery, which Stepan got from the legendary Mistress of the Copper Mountain. A good-hearted former mining foreman (щегарь; shchegar') who was something of a scholar had identified and appraised the gems, and advised her not to sell the casket for a paltry sum. So when the widow with three children to feed could not farm as well as her husband became strapped for money, her in-laws pressured her to sell the box, and merchants flocked to her offering a 100 or 200 rubles, hoping to cheat her. But she wisely refused because of the advice. But the jewellery were tricky for the widow Natasya to use, because the rings would turn too tight after leaving house, and earrings and necklace would also become ill-fitting.

Tanyushka, who was the only daughter, was also adamant about not selling it. She was the father's favorite, and took it particularly hard when he died, becoming emaciated. So the mother eventually allowed her to play with the Casket. Every piece of jewellery looks good on her. Tanyushka, with black hair and green eyes, did not look like her parents at all, and some accused her of being a changeling. In fact, her appearance resembles that of the Mistress of the Copper Mountain, and the father had been fond of her green eyes taking after the malachite which was his job to find, giving her the nickname "Remembrance".

Tanyushka grew older and became able to fetch the Casket herself, though it was inside a bottom chest, weighed on top by another chest which she could now lift. Although her daily routine was to play with them after her chores, a man appeared one day who armed himself with the family's axe, apparently wishing to steal the treasure. But he was struck with a burn in his eyes and he was foiled. (Note: The shining light that blinded this thief came from Tanyushka's jewel box, according to Lipovetsky.) The mother then hid the Casket buried under the earth, but Tanyushka magically became aware of its whereabouts.

The family continued to struggle for a few years, until there was some relief when the boys started earning wages, and Tanyushka too had become so skilled at embroidery, her designs marvelled the accomplished seamstresses. Tanyushka had been taught the craft by a female vagabond who chanced to ask the family for a couple days of lodging. The teacher and the girl became closely attached, to Nastasya's grief, making her mope that the girl "doesn't want to come to her own mother, but hugs a tramp". Tanyushka even shares the secret of the Casket, and the woman in return shows her a vision of the Malachite Room of the Tsar's palace, decorated with the malachite that Stepan mined. She leaves as a parting gift to Tanyushka a small button of cut glass or crystal, which she is instructed to peer into when in need of answers. It can be surmised that this beggar woman staying to teach Tanyushka was in fact the powerful Mistress of the Copper Mountain in disguise.

Meanwhile Tanyushka grows up. She becomes an incredibly skilled needleworker and a great beauty, but keeps to herself and avoids other girls' company. People start calling her "a stone statue". A lot of young men at the Polevaya plant are attracted to her, but do not dare to approach her because of her coldness. Nastasya blames this behaviour on the vagabond "sorceress". One day a tragedy occurs in the family: the house is burned to the ground. Nastasya is forced to a decision to sell the gems of the Malachite Casket. Tanyushka peers into her button and sees the green-eyed woman nodding, and Tanyushka reminds herself that the gems will eventually go to her (i.e., presumably the Mistress of the Copper Mountain) anyway.Bazhov & Williams tr. (1944), p. 62 A lot of merchants are interested in the jewellery, and are willing to pay more than before, a 1000 rubles, but still haggle for various prices under Nastasya's asking price of 2000. At the same time, a new factory manager (приказчик, (Note: Cf. заводской приказчик: "the manager of the factory acting on instructions of the owner".) also translated as "bailiff") arrives at the plant. He is quickly nicknamed "Flogger" (Russian: Паротя; Parotya) because he always orders flagellation as a form of punishment. He had been offered the post by the Old Master (owner of the plant), after agreeing to marry the mistress of the Old Master's son (because the owner's son was supposed to marry a noblewoman and the mistress was in the way). Eventually Mrs. Flogger (who as ex-mistress received a handsome severance pay from the owner) buys the Casket at full price. However she cannot wear the jewellery because every piece of it pains her. She asks various craftsmen to fix it for her, but all of them refuse to touch the gemstones, explaining that none of the craftsmen is willing to quarrel with their maker and they were made to fit one person only. Flogger's wife gives up and decides to resell the Casket at earliest convenience.

Then the Old Master dies, and his son wants his mistress back. Flogger is angry at first, and takes to heavy drinking with co-workers. Then when he lays eyes on Tanyushka's beauty, he is smitten, and tries to court the girl, but only comes to a business arrangement where he commissions Tanyushka to make an embroidered portrait of her likeness, only dressed in a tsarina's robe and gems. Flogger has a quarrel with the woman who is still his wife: he shows her the portrait of the one he says is his new beloved, but the wife insists it has to be some wealthy woman from outside, not a village woman within his reach. In turn, Flogger insults the woman for paying 2000 for jewels she cannot even wear, piquing the interest of the Young Master, who is a gem connoisseur and insists on buying them. He then sends for the portrait girl, to see for himself, and now it is the Young Master Turchaninov's turn to fall in love with Tanyushka, especially after he has her try on those very jewels. He proposes marriage which she Tanyushka at first laughs off, but when he persists, she agrees to on condition he shows her the Tsarina herself at the Malachite Room in Saint Petersburg. Turchaninov agrees. Dressed like a queen, Tanyushka arrives at the Palace, and walks directly to the Malachite Room. Tsarina enters the room, saying: "Now then, show me this high-handed maid". Upon hearing that Tanyushka frowns and says to Turchaninov: "I told ye to show me the Tsarina, and you've done it so as to show me to her. [...] I don't want to see any more of ye". Adding that he is no match for her anyway, Tanyushka leans against the malachite wall and melts away. Her gems separate and are stuck in the wall but when Turchaninov tries to retrieve them, they turn into liquid drops in his clutches. Then he picks up the glass button. From it, Tanyushka could be seen as if staring out of a mirror. Turchaninov loses his wits and is financially ruined, his assets all mortgaged up. Tanyushka is never seen again, but people rumor that there is now a second double to the Mistress of the Copper Mountain in malachite dress. (Note: Cf. Bazhov & Williams tr. (1944) "The Malachite Casket", pp. 42–62)

== Themes ==
Most scholars agree that Tanyushka—literally or metaphorically—is the daughter of the Mistress of the Copper Mountain. It was suggested that the Casket symbolizes the mystery that connected Stepan and the Mistress, or the secret marriage between the two. The Casket disappeared from the world of humans together with its owner, Tanyushka. Yelena Prikazchikova commented that Tanyushka is a typical changeling, the child of the mountain spirit and the mortal. Nataliya Shvabauer noted that Tanyushka is obviously the one destined to inherit the Casket, as she is inhumanly beautiful and is more attracted to gemstones than to people. Her mother Nastasya is an ordinary person, while the girl can appreciate the magic of the Mistress's gift. Tanyushka resembles the Mistress in every way, and just like her does not tolerate deceit.

On Tanyushka's melting away into the malachite wall, Prikazchikova said that petrifaction in fiction would normally mean death, but Tanyushka is the Mistress's double, so such act was like coming home for her. Mark Lipovetsky commented that while the Mistress embodies the struggle and unity between Eros and Thanatos, Tanyushka inherits the sexual magic: her beauty is striking and blinding men. Just like the Mistress persistently and spitefully provokes the local administration, forcing the protagonists ("The Mistress of the Copper Mountain", "The Two Lizards") to relay offensive messages, Tanyushka puts up resistance to the Tsarina herself. The Malachite Room is the symbol of magical power of stone in the human world. The magical malachite was used for simple human needs, to decorate the imperial chambers, which displeases the Mistress on principle. Therefore she tries in every possible way to demonstrate her power over it and makes the noble women cower before Tanyushka.

Denis Zherdev commented that the Mistress of the Copper Mountain's female domain is the world of chaos. It collides with the ordered factory world, and brings in randomness, variability, unpredictability and capriciousness. He also pointed out that the most important value in most Bazhov's early stories is family, and those who do not have that (e.g. Tanyushka) are never completely "normal".

Lipovetsky mentioned Freud's interpretation of the motif of a double as a symbolic manifestation of death. The theme of the person leaving for the mountains at the end of his life is present in the story. Similar plot device can be found in "Two Lizards".

== Reception ==
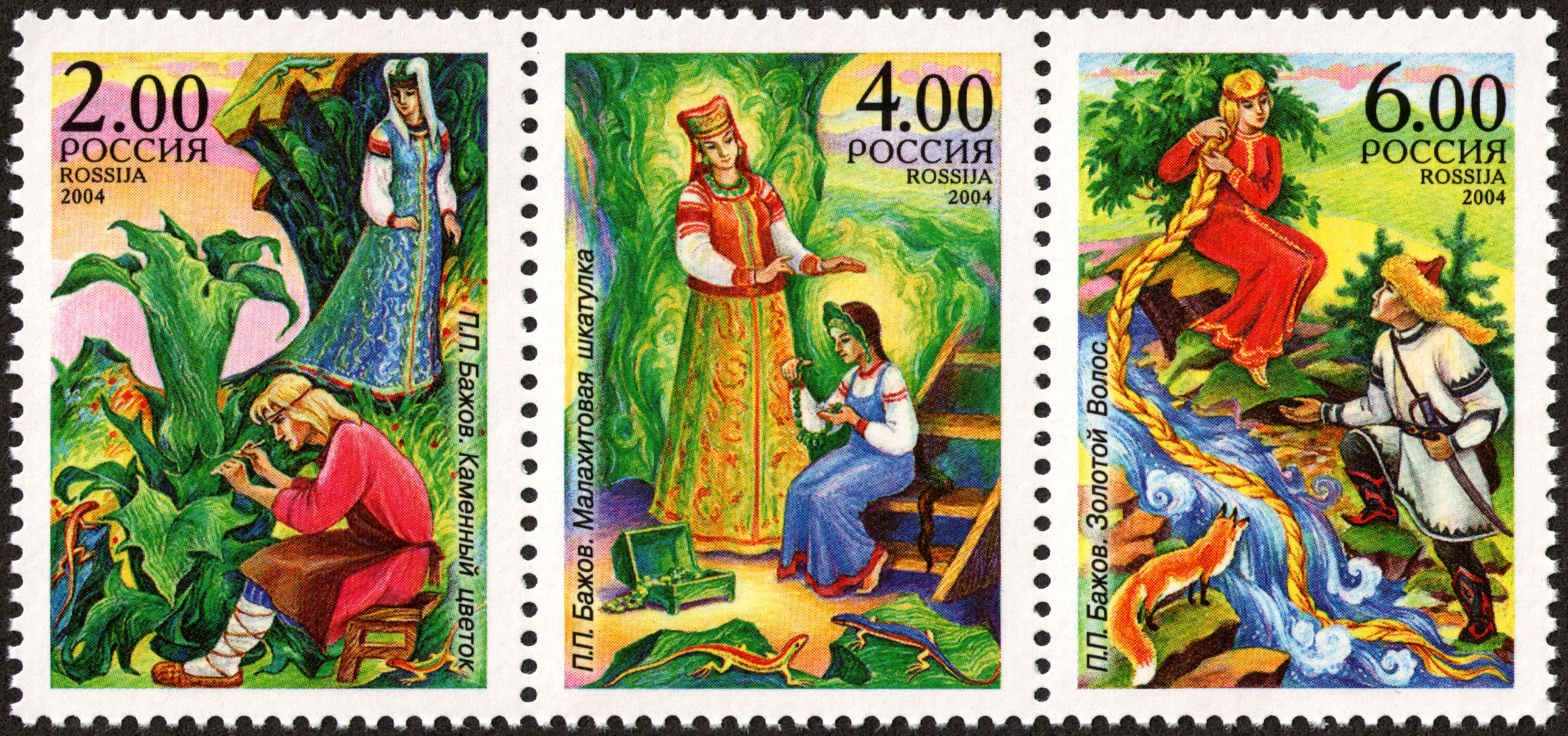
The characters from The Malachite Casket collection in the 2004 Russian stamps (from left to right): Danilo and the Mistress of the Copper Mountain ("The Stone Flower"), the Mistress and Tanyushka ("The Malachite Casket"), and the hunter Ailyp and his ladylove Golden Hair ("Golden Hair").

"The Malachite Casket" is considered to be one of the best stories in the collection. The style of the story was praised. "The Malachite Casket" has been a popular subject for analysis. During Soviet times, every edition of The Malachite Box was usually prefaced by an essay commenting on the creativity of the Ural miners, cruel landlords, social oppression and the "great workers unbroken by the centuries of slavery". Maya Nikulina noted that one editor called the Casket a symbol "of hard work and persistence". The later scholars focused more on the symbolism and the relationship of the characters with the mysterious. Tanyushka was called Bazhov's classical binary character: on the one hand, she is a truth seeker and a talented person, on the other hand, she is an outsider, who violates social norms.

== Adaptations ==
The story inspired several film and stage adaptations.

- Stepan's Remembrance, a 1976 Soviet film, the adaptation of "The Mistress of the Copper Mountain" and "The Malachite Casket".
- The Malachite Casket, a 1972 filmstrip.
- The 2012 opera The Malachite Casket, based on "The Mistress of the Copper Mountain" and "The Malachite Casket", was created by Dmitry Batin.

=== The 1976 film ===
The film The Malachite Casket was a part of the animated film series made at Sverdlovsk Film Studio from the early 1970s to early 1980s, on time for the 100th anniversary since the birth of Pavel Bazhov. The series included the following films: Sinyushka's Well (1973), The Mistress of the Copper Mountain (1975), The Malachite Casket, The Stone Flower (1977), Podaryonka (based on "Silver Hoof", 1978), Golden Hair (1979), and The Grass Hideaway (1982).

The Malachite Casket is a stop motion animated film directed by Oleg Nikolaevsky, with screenplay by Alexander Timofeevsky. It was narrated by Y. Puzyrev. The music was composed by Vladislav Kazenin and performed by the State Symphony Cinema Orchestra.

== Sources ==
- Bazhov, Pavel (1952). "Ural'skiye skazy" Уральские сказы [Ural tales]. In Bazhova, Valentina A.; Surkov, Alexey A. [in Russian]; Permyak, Evgeny Andreevich [in Russian] (eds.). Sobranie sochinenij v trekh tomakh Собрание сочинений в трех томах [Works. In Three Volumes] (in Russian). Vol. 1. Annotated by Lyudmila I. Skorino. Moscow: Khudozhestvennaya Literatura.
- Bazhov, Pavel Petrovich (1944). The Malachite Casket: tales from the Urals. Library of selected Soviet literature. Translated by Alan Moray Williams. Hutchinson & Co. ltd. ISBN 9787250005603.
- Bazhov, Pavel (1950s). Malachite Casket: Tales from the Urals. Translated by Eve Manning. Moscow: Foreign Languages Publishing House. pdf@archive.org; fulltext@issu.com (restricted access)
- Lipovetsky, Mark (2014). "Zloveshcheye v skazakh Bazhova" Зловещее в сказах Бажова [The Uncanny in Bazhov's Tales]. Quaestio Rossica (in Russian and English). 2 (2): 212–230. doi:10.15826/qr.2014.2.051. hdl:10995/27732. ISSN 2311-911X.
- Nikulina, Maya [in Russian] (2003). "Pro zemelnye dela i pro tajnuju silu. O dalnikh istokakh uralskoj mifologii P.P. Bazhova" Про земельные дела и про тайную силу. О дальних истоках уральской мифологии П.П. Бажова [Of land and the secret force. The distant sources of P.P. Bazhov's Ural mythology]. Filologichesky Klass (in Russian). 9.
- Prikazchikova, Yelena [in Russian] (2003). "Kamennaja sila mednykh gor Urala" Каменная сила медных гор Урала [The Stone Force of The Ural Copper Mountains] (PDF). Izvestiya of the Ural State University (in Russian). 28. The Ural State University: 11–23.
- P. P. Bazhov i socialisticheskij realizm // Tvorchestvo P.P. Bazhova v menjajushhemsja mire П. П. Бажов и социалистический реализм // Творчество П. П. Бажова в меняющемся мире [Pavel Bazhov and socialist realism // The works of Pavel Bazhov in the changing world]. The materials of the inter-university research conference devoted to the 125th birthday (in Russian). Yekaterinburg: The Ural State University. 28–29 January 2004. pp. 18–26.
