= Silver Hoof =

- Short story by Pavel Bazhov
- Original title: Серебряное копытце
- Translator: Alan Moray Williams (first), Eve Manning, et al.
- Country: Soviet Union
- Language: Russian
- Genre: skaz (fairy tale)

Publication
- Published in: Uralsky Sovremennik
- Publication type: anthology
- Publisher: Sverdlovsk Publishing House
- Media type: print
- Publication date: 1938
- Published in English: 1944
- Series: The Malachite Casket collection (list of stories)

"Silver Hoof" (Russian: Серебряное копытце, romanized: Serebrjanoe kopyttse, lit. 'Small Silver Hoof') is a fairy tale short story written by Pavel Bazhov, based on the folklore of the Ural region of Siberia. It was first published in Uralsky Sovremennik in 1938, and later included in The Malachite Casket collection. In this fairy tale, the characters meet the legendary zoomorphic creature from the Ural folklore called Silver Hoof. In 1944, the story was translated from Russian into English by Alan Moray Williams and published by Hutchinson. In the 1950s, another translation was made by Eve Manning. It was included in James Riordan's collection of stories The Mistress of the Copper Mountain: Tales from the Urals, published in 1974 by Frederick Muller Ltd. Riordan heard the tales from a headteacher when he was bedridden in Sverdlovsk. After returning to England he rewrote the tales from memory, checking them against Bazhov's book. He preferred not to call himself "translator", he believed that "communicator" was more appropriate.

== Sources ==
Bazhov's stories are based on the oral lore of the miners and gold prospectors. The character of Silver Hoof is based on the Ural legends. Bazhov mentioned that he had heard tales about the mythical creature Silver Deer, also known as the elk Golden Horns and the goat Silver Hoof. The exact origin of the creature is unknown, but deer have significant roles in the mythology of various peoples located all over the world. In the folklore tales, the goat/deer can be either friendly or harmful. Golden or silver deer/elk became popular in the Urals in the 18th century. According to the Bashkir folklore, dreaming about a goat is a good omen. The Finno-Ugric peoples prayed to the Elk. The depictions of the animal were found among Permian bronze casts. While the character of Silver Hoof is in fact based on the legends, the actual storyline was penned by Bazhov.

== Publication ==
The author heard the tales about the goat with a silver hoof at the Urals from the hunter named Bulatov. The tales seemed to originate from the area where many people were engaged in the searches for chrysolites. But Bazhov had to write the storyline for "Silver Hoof" himself. "Silver Hoof" was completed on 3 August 1938.

The tale was not included in the first edition of The Malachite Box. But, inspired by its success, Bazhov continued working on his stories. The tales "Sinyushka's Well", "Silver Hoof", and "The Demidov Caftans" were finished before the publication of the collection. It was first published in 1938 in the 2nd volume of Sverdlovsk Publishing House's Uralsky Sovremennik. It was then released as a part of Sverdlovsk Publishing House's children's collection Morozko.

== Plot ==
An old man Kokovanya has no family and decides to adopt an orphan. He learns that Daryonka (lit. "A gift"), a 6-year-old girl, has recently lost her family and invites her to live with him. She accepts, and when she asks about his profession, he reveals that he works as a gold prospector in the summer, and in the winter hunts for a certain goat in the forests, because he wants "to see where he stamps his right forefoot". Kokovanya, Daryonka and her cat named Muryonka start living together.

Kokovanya works to earn their living, the girl cleans the house and cooks. Winter comes, and Kokovanya decides to go hunting in the forest as usual. He tells Daryonka about the grey roe deer called Silver Hoof:

That's a very special deer. On his right forefoot he's got a silver hoof. And when he stamps with that silver hoof he leaves a gem there. If he stamps once there's one gem, if he stamps twice there are two, and if he begins to paw the ground there'll be a whole pile. [...] Ordinary deer have two antlers, but this one's got antlers, with five tines.

Unlike other deer' antlers, Silver Hoof's antlers are not shed in winter, and that is how Kokovanya is planning to recognize him. Daryonka begs the old man to take her hunting, and he reluctantly agrees. The cat follows them too. In the forest, Kokovanya goes hunting every day and comes back with a lot of regular deer meat and skins. Soon they have so much meat that Kokovanya has to go back to the village to bring the horse, so that they could carry everything back. He leaves the girl in the forest for a while. Next morning Daryonka sees Silver Hoof passing by. That night, she sees her cat Muryonka sitting in the glade with the roe deer in front of her, as if they are communicating. They run about the glade for a long time. Next day Muryonka and the deer are gone, but Kokovanya and Daryonka find a lot of gemstones. "After that people often found stones in the glade where the roe deer had run about. Most of them were green ones, chrysolites, folks call them."

== Analysis ==
Pavel Bazhov indicated that all his stories can be divided into two groups based on tone: "child-toned" (e.g. "The Fire-Fairy") and "adult-toned" (e.g. "The Stone Flower"). He called "Silver Hoof" a "child-toned" story. Such stories have simple plots, children are the main characters, and the mythical creatures help them, typically leading the story to a happy ending.

In Bazhov's tales chrysolites, unlike ill-omened malachite and emeralds, are meant for humans and bring happiness to their lives. They are "children's" stones that appear in the "child-toned" stories. Children play with chrysolites in the very first story from The Malachite Box, "Beloved Name". As an amulet, the chrysolite can banish demons, strengthen spiritual resistance, give courage and protect from night terrors. After his "conversation" with the cat, Silver Hoof gives the gemstones as a gift to Daryonka. This gift can be regarded as corporeal and spiritual at the same time, a sacred gift that is bestowed upon good people only. Bazhov himself did not believe that gemstones could bring luck or protect from envy, jealousy and the evil eye.

Bazhov liked the idea of a child together with an old man contacting the mythical creatures. These people are traditionally portrayed as the closest to the otherworldly, but at the same time they are the least reliable narrators in the adult world. The cat Muryonka is a literary creation, not the folklore character, because such insignificant character couldn't have remained intact in the oral tradition. It is an "intermediary", a linking creature that ties the real world and the mythical world. Cats in the literary tradition cats are often depicted as travellers between worlds.

== Adaptations ==
A 1947 children's play of the same name was written by Bazhov and Evgeny Permyak. Mariya Litovskaya criticized Permyak for oversimplifying an already simple story. She commented that he had been obviously trying to create a fun children's play, and therefore had added a clear antagonist and a lot of secondary characters, such as the fox, the bear, the eagle-owl. Litovskaya said that he had turned the "multilayered tale" into "the tale of friendship between humans and animals, and the battle between good and evil". She also noted that Pavel Bazhov had not been opposed to the changes.

Lyubov Nikolskaya composed the children's opera Silver Hoof based on the story of the same name in 1959.

There is a radio play by Beryl E. Jones.

=== The 1978 film ===
The film Podaryonka (also known as Little Present), based on "Silver Hoof", was a part of the animated film series made at Sverdlovsk Film Studio from the early 1970s to early 1980s, on time for the 100th anniversary since the birth of Pavel Bazhov. The series included the following films: Sinyushka's Well (1973), The Mistress of the Copper Mountain (1975), The Malachite Casket, The Stone Flower (1977), Podaryonka, Golden Hair (1979), and The Grass Hideaway (1982).

Podaryonka is a stop motion animated film directed by Igor Reznikov, with screenplay by Alexander Rozin. It was narrated by V. Dugin,. The music was composed by Vladislav Kazenin performed by the State Symphony Cinema Orchestra.
