= The Stone Flower (1977 film) =

- Каменный цветок
- Directed by: Oleg Nikolaevsky
- Screenplay by: Alexander Timofeevsky
- Story by: Pavel Bazhov
- Narrated by: Y. Puzyrev
- Cinematography: Valentin Bazhenov
- Music by: Vladislav Kazenin
- Production company: Sverdlovsk Film Studio
- Distributed by: USSR Gosteleradio
- Release date: 1977
- Running time: 26 min. 35 sec.
- Country: Soviet Union
- Language: Russian

The Stone Flower (Russian: Каменный цветок, romanized: Kamennyj tsvetok) is a stop motion animated film directed by Oleg Nikolaevsky. It is an adaptation of Pavel Bazhov's stories "The Stone Flower" and its sequel "The Master Craftsman". It was released by Sverdlovsk Film Studio in 1977.

The film combined stop motion and live action scenes. It was narrated by Y. Puzyrev, with the music composed by Vladislav Kazenin.

The Stone Flower is a part of the animated film series made at Sverdlovsk Film Studio from the early 1970s to early 1980s, on time for the 100th anniversary since the birth of Pavel Bazhov. The series included the following films: Sinyushka's Well (1973), The Mistress of the Copper Mountain (1975), The Malachite Casket (1976), The Stone Flower (1977), Podaryonka (based on "Silver Hoof", 1978), Golden Hair (1979), and The Grass Hideaway (1982).

== Plot summary ==
The plot of The Stone Flower closely follows Pavel Bazhov's story of the same name. An unreliable and forgetful young boy Danilo is sent to study under the old stone craftsman Prokopych. He quickly surpasses his teacher and becomes the amazing worker. He can masterfully carve stone figures and create intricate designs from gemstones. The landlord orders him to make a stone cup. Danilo works on it for a long time, but he feels that his flower cup "is not alive" and the stone loses its beauty when he works with it. Danilo goes to the Mistress of the Copper Mountain and asks her to show him the Stone Flower. The legends say that those who see the legendary Flower start to understand the beauty of stone, but never return from the Mistress's domain. The Mistress grants his request. Danilo looks at the Flower and realizes that he could never find the perfect stone for it. He goes back home, destroys his cup and leaves.

The second part is based on Pavel Bazhov's "The Master Craftsman". Danilo's fiancée Katyenka misses him and refuses to marry anyone else. She believes that he will come back from the Copper Mountain. One day Katyenka meets the Mistress herself and asks her to return Danilo to the village. The Mistress arranges a meeting between them and presents Danilo with a choice: "If you go with her you forget all that is mine, if you remain here, then you must forget her and all living people". Danilo chooses to return with Katyenka. He becomes a well known craftsman, "The Mountain Craftsman".
