= Sinyushka's Well =

- Short story by Pavel Bazhov
- Original title: Синюшкин колодец
- Translator: Alan Moray Williams (first), Eve Manning, et al.
- Country: Soviet Union
- Language: Russian
- Genre: skaz

Publication
- Published in: Moscow Almanac
- Publication type: anthology
- Media type: print
- Publication date: 1939
- Published in English: 1944
- Series: The Malachite Casket collection (list of stories)

"Sinyushka's Well" (Russian: Синюшкин колодец, romanized: Sinyushkin kolodets, lit. 'Sinyushka's Water Well'), also known as "The Blue Crone's Spring" and "The Blue Baba of the Marsh", is a folk tale (the so-called skaz) of the Ural region of Siberia collected and reworked by Pavel Bazhov. It was first published in the Moscow Almanac in 1939 (pp. 256–266). It was later included in The Malachite Casket collection. "Sinyushka's Well" is one of the most famous stories in the collection and is still popular nowadays. The story was translated from Russian into English by Alan Moray Williams in 1944, and by Eve Manning in the 1950s.

It is one of the tales about mining pioneers. The tale is told from the point of view of the imaginary Old Man Slyshko (Russian: Дед Слышко, romanized: Ded Slyshko; alternative translation: Grandpa Slyshko).

There is a blue fog above Sinyushka's well. Her main function is to keep the mountain riches from the greedy and undeserving. Nataliya Shvabauer believed that this character did not exist in the original Ural folk tradition, but the author constructed it according to the "mythological canon".

== Publication ==
The tale was not included in the first edition of The Malachite Box. Inspired by its success, Bazhov continued working on his stories. The tales "Sinyushka's Well", "Silver Hoof", and "The Demidov Caftans" were finished even before the publication of the first edition.

Bazhov's stories are based on the oral lore of the miners and gold prospectors. When questioned about the source, Bazhov quoted the Ural anecdote about a man who was walking home drunk, and decided to drink some water from the well. The girl appeared from the well, and "the rest is indecent". Bazhov claimed that he heard about the character near the Zuzelsky mine.

In 1944 the story was translated from Russian into English by Alan Moray Williams and published by Hutchinson as a part of The Malachite Casket: Tales from the Urals collection. The title was translated as "Sinyushka's Well". In the 1950s another translation of The Malachite Casket was made by Eve Manning The story was published as "The Blue Crone's Spring". It was included in James Riordan's collection of stories The Mistress of the Copper Mountain: Tales from the Urals, published in 1974 by Frederick Muller Ltd. Riordan heard the tales from a headteacher when he was bedridden in Sverdlovsk. After returning to England he rewrote the tales from memory, checking them against Bazhov's book. He preferred not to call himself "translator", he believed that "communicator" was more appropriate. He translated the title as "The Blue Baba of the Marsh".

== Plot summary ==
The factory guy Ilya walks through the forest and comes across a water well. He wants to drink some water, but suddenly a crone comes out of the well. Her name is The Blue Crone (Sinyushka). She looks very old, but has a young voice and good-looking teeth. She orders Ilya to come back at night when a moon is full and promises to shower him with riches. Ilya is not interested in money, he wishes to see how The Blue Crone "turns into a lovely maid", because she only shows this face in front of brave and simple people. Sinyushka challenges the hero to scoop up and drink water from her well.

After seeing the maid, Ilya cannot forget her until he meets a real girl that looks almost like the Crone. Ilya marries her, but the girl worked at the marble quarries since childhood, and suffers from tuberculosis. She doesn't live long, and Ilya dies soon after.

== Analysis ==
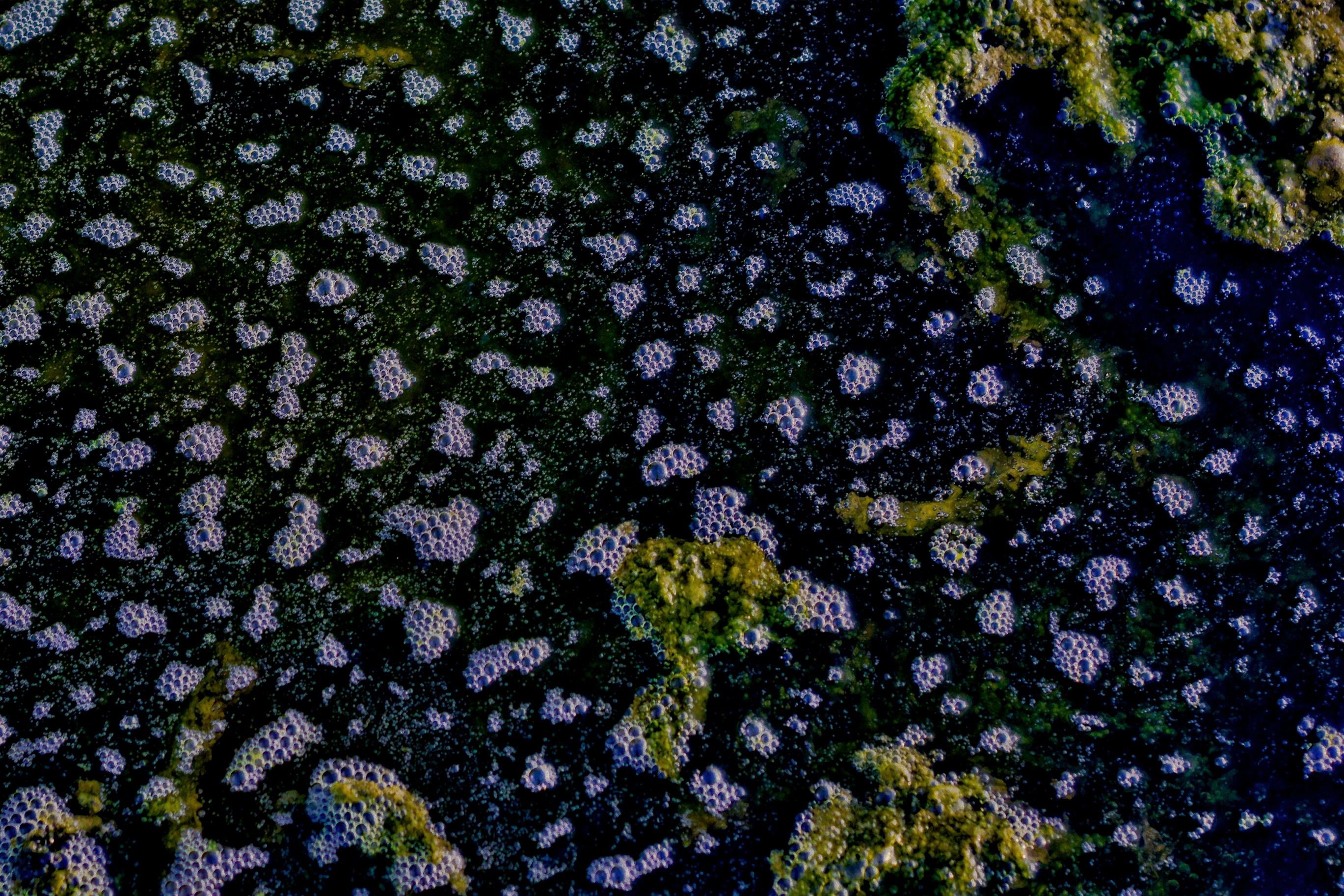
Marsh gas was called "sinyushka" at the Urals.

The crone (Sinyushka) was one of the mythical creatures created by the populace to explain various unexplained natural phenomena. Sinyushka acts like a magical helper and presents a threat to the characters at the same time. She represents deceptive and deadly marsh gas, which was actually called "sinyushka" at the Urals. Marina Balina suggested that a contact Sinyushka is a symbolic manifestation of death. As one of the "mountain spirits", she does not hesitate to kill those who did not pass her tests, but even those who had been rewarded by her do not live happily ever after: Ilya dies soon, this time not metaphorically but literally. This character is one of the few still remembered in the region.

The crone, "who later predictably turns into a stunning beauty", challenges the hero to drink water from her well. "The parallel of this act to a sexual challenge is emphasized by the fact that the protagonist attaches his pot to a long pole, which, however, turns out to be to weak and breaks in half, to Sinyushka's amusement. Having humiliated the protagonist's male power, the magical woman forgives and eventually rewards him with riches".

As for the creature being female, Bazhov believed that miners simply missed women, because their work allowed for little contact with them, and therefore so many of their stories had female creatures. All sexual references in Pavel Bazhov's stories were of course very subtle, owing to Soviet puritanism.

Denis Zherdev pointed out that Bazhov clearly defines important values in his stories, and Ilya is "an ideal man"— a "simple soul", brave, patient, and hard-working. Zherdev believed that the most important value for Bazhov is family. It serves as the criterion of normality in the characters' lives, e.g. the man who is married lives "correctly". But in most early stories the family happiness is short-lived, as in this one, unattainable ("Beloved Name", "Yermak's Swans"), or flawed ("Zhabrei's Path", "Golden Hair").

== Adaptations ==
A 1947 play Tales from the Urals at the Moscow Puppet Theater was based on "Sinyushka's Well" and "Golden Hair". The story was adapted for children's theatre by K. Filippova. Mariya Litovskaya criticized her for oversimplifying already simple story, e.g. the ending was changed from:

With this maid Ilya found his happiness. But not for long. She came from the marble quarries, you see, that's why he hadn't seen her before. Well, we know what that marble cutting meant. There were no maids fairer in our parts than the ones from there, but he who wed one was soon a widower. They worked with that stone from the time they were children, and they were consumptive one and all. Ilya didn't live long either.

To:

With this maid Ilya found his happiness. She came from the marble quarries. That's why he hadn't seen her before. There were no maids fairer in our parts than the ones from there.

Litovskaya comments that Pavel Bazhov was not opposed to the changes.

Vladimir Goryachikh composed the ballet The Living Stone (Russian: Живой камень, romanized: Zhivoj kamen) based on "Sinyushka's Well", which premiered in Nizhny Tagil in 1965.

The 1973 film Sinyushka's Well was a part of the animated film series made at Sverdlovsk Film Studio from the early 1970s to early 1980s, on time for the 100th anniversary since the birth of Pavel Bazhov. The series included the following films: Sinyushka's Well (1973), The Mistress of the Copper Mountain (1975), The Malachite Casket, The Stone Flower (1977), Podaryonka (based on "Silver Hoof", 1978), Golden Hair (1979), and The Grass Hideaway (1982). The film was directed by Valery Fomin, with screenplay by A. Rozina. It was narrated by Nikolay Trofimov. The music was composed by Evgeny Rodygin.

The 1978 Soviet film Sinyushka's Well was made on Sverdlovsk Film Studio for the 100th anniversary since the birth of Pavel Bazhov. It was directed and written by Mikhail Sharov, with music by Arseniy Popovitch. The film stars Vyacheslav Voskresensky as Ilya, Tatyana Malyagina as Sinyushka, Vladimir Kabalin as Kuzma, and Nina Lazhentseva as Lukerya.

In 2006 the story was adapted into the musical for Russian folk instruments orchestra by Svetlana Nesterova.

== See also ==
- Baba Yaga
- List of stories within The Malachite Box

== Sources ==
- Bazhov, Pavel (1952). Valentina Bazhova; Alexey Surkov; Yevgeny Permyak (eds.). Sobranie sochinenij v trekh tomakh Собрание сочинений в трех томах [Works. In Three Volumes] (in Russian). Vol. 1. Moscow: Khudozhestvennaya Literatura.
- Bazhov, Pavel; translated by Alan Moray Williams (1944). The Malachite Casket: tales from the Urals. Library of selected Soviet literature. The University of California: Hutchinson & Co. ltd. ISBN 9787250005603.
- Bazhov, Pavel; translated by Eve Manning (1950s). Malachite Casket: Tales from the Urals. Moscow: Foreign Languages Publishing House.
- Lipovetsky, Mark (2014). "The Uncanny in Bazhov's Tales". Quaestio Rossica (in Russian). 2 (2). The University of Colorado Boulder: 212–230. doi:10.15826/qr.2014.2.051. hdl:10995/27732. ISSN 2311-911X.
- Balina, Marina; Rudova, Larissa (1 February 2013). Russian Children's Literature and Culture. Literary Criticism. Routledge. ISBN 978-1135865566.
- Shvabauer, Nataliya (10 January 2009). "Tipologija fantasticheskih personazhej v folklore gornorabochih Zapadnoj Evropy i Rossii" Типология фантастических персонажей в фольклоре горнорабочих Западной Европы и России [The Typology of the Fantastic Characters in the Miners' Folklore of Western Europe and Russia] (PDF). Dissertation (in Russian). The Ural State University. Archived from the original (PDF) on 26 November 2015.
- Litovskaya, Mariya (2014). "Vzroslyj detskij pisatel Pavel Bazhov: konflikt redaktur" Взрослый детский писатель Павел Бажов: конфликт редактур [The Adult-Children's Writer Pavel Bazhov: The Conflict of Editing]. Detskiye Chteniya (in Russian). 6 (2): 243–254.
- P. P. Bazhov i socialisticheskij realizm // Tvorchestvo P.P. Bazhova v menjajushhemsja mire П. П. Бажов и социалистический реализм // Творчество П. П. Бажова в меняющемся мире [Pavel Bazhov and socialist realism // The works of Pavel Bazhov in the changing world]. The materials of the inter-university research conference devoted to the 125th birthday (in Russian). Yekaterinburg: The Ural State University. 28–29 January 2004. pp. 18–26.
