= The Mistress of the Copper Mountain (fairy tale) =

- Short story by Pavel Bazhov
- Original title: Медной горы хозяйка
- Translator: Alan Moray Williams (first), Eve Manning, et al.
- Country: Soviet Union
- Language: Russian
- Genre: skaz

Publication
- Published in: Krasnaya Nov
- Publication type: Periodical
- Media type: Print (magazine, hardback and paperback)
- Publication date: 1936

Chronology
- Series: The Malachite Casket collection (list of stories)
The Great Snake	The Manager's Boot-Soles

"The Mistress of the Copper Mountain" (Russian: Медной горы хозяйка, romanized: Mednoj gory hozjajka), also known as "The Queen of the Copper Mountain" or "The Mistress of the Copper Mine", is a folk tale (the so-called skaz) of the Ural region of Russia collected and reworked by Pavel Bazhov. It was first published in the 11th issue of the Krasnaya Nov literary magazine in 1936 and later the same year as a part of the collection Prerevolutionary Folklore of the Urals.

It was later reprinted as a part of the collection The Malachite Box in 1939. In 1944 the story was translated from Russian into English by Alan Moray Williams and published by Hutchinson. In the 1950s, another translation was made by Eve Manning. The story was published in the collection Russian Magic Tales from Pushkin to Platonov, published by Penguin Books in 2012. It was translated by Anna Gunin. It was included in James Riordan's collection of stories The Mistress of the Copper Mountain: Tales from the Urals, published in 1974 by Frederick Muller Ltd. Riordan heard the tales from a headteacher when he was bedridden in Sverdlovsk. After returning to England, he rewrote the tales from memory, checking them against Bazhov's book. He preferred not to call himself "translator", believing that "communicator" was more appropriate.

== Background ==
Bazhov's stories are based on the oral lore of Ural miners and gold prospectors. Mythical creatures such as the Great Snake or the Mistress of the Copper Mountain were well known to Bazhov from stories that were told by his own family members (Pavel Bazhov was born at the village near the Sysert Mining Plant) and by the old men at the plant. Those old people were experienced workers who had worked in the industry for all their lives, but were exhausted by many years of hard work. They were sent to do light-duty work, such as guard the place, etc. They were the story-tellers who knew a lot of legends about the plants and the miners' lives. From a very young age Bazhov, began writing down local folk tales.

Geographically, the folk tales came from the old The Sysert Mining District, which included five mining plants, i. e. Sysert (Sysertsky), the head plant of the district, Polevskoy (also known as Polevaya or Poleva), Seversky (Severna), Verkhny (Verkh-Sysertsky), and Ilyinsky (Nizhve-Sysertsky). The most famous copper mine of the Ural Mountains, the Gumeshevski mine or "Gumeshki", was located next to the Polevskoy plant. It was also called "The Copper Mountain" or simply "The Mountain". Most folk tales were connected with this place.

== Publication ==
This skaz was first published together with "The Great Snake" and "Beloved Name" in the 11th issue of Krasnaya Nov in 1936. "Beloved Name" was published on the pages 5–9, "The Great Snake" on pp. 9–12, and "The Mistress of the Copper Mountain" on pp. 12–17. These tales are the ones that follow the original Ural miners' folklore most closely. Despite their origins in oral tradition, Bazhov was credited as the original author of these texts. The stories were included in the collection Prerevolutionary Folklore of the Urals (Russian: Дореволюционный фольклор на Урале, romanized: Dorevoljucionnyj folklor na Urale), released later the same year by Sverdlovsk Publishing House. In this book, Bazhov was mentioned as the collector of texts.

Bazhov himself tried to avoid the question of authorship, joking that "questions such as these should be left to scholars". Nowadays Bazhov's tales are generally accepted as his "literary work based on Ural folklore"; although he did not change the plots of the folk tales, the book conveys certain ideological concepts common for that time period. Additionally, his manuscripts demonstrate that a significant amount of professional work was put into the composition and language of the stories.

== Plot summary ==
In this skaz, a young factory worker named Stepan meets a woman in the unusual clothing. He realizes that the woman is the legendary Mistress of the Copper Mountain. She orders Stepan to tell his factory manager (заводской приказчик; (Note: "the manager of the factory acting on instructions of the owner".) also translated as "bailiff"), the "stinking goat", to abandon the Krasnogorsk mine so as not to damage her "iron cap", if they wished to keep successfully harvesting from the "Gumeshky" copper mine (Гумешки i.e., Gumeshevski mine), threatening to sink the copper into the deep earth. Stepan does as he is told and pays the price: he is flogged and assigned by the mine foreman (надзиратель рудничный приказчик, (Note: надзиратель "a foreman at a factory".) translated as "overseer") to a mine face. He is then saved by the Mistress herself. She brings Stepan to her domain and presents him with a rich dowry as proposal of marriage. Stepan honestly replies that he has already promised to marry another girl, Nastya (Настя, Настенька, Nastya, Nastenka, also tr. "Nastasya"). The Mistress is delighted by his reply and reveals that her proposal was a test of Stepan's honesty and integrity. She presents a malachite casket filled with jewelry for Nastya and lets Stepan go, making a final request that Stepan forgets about her. However, Stepan finds that he cannot forget her. He marries Nastya and lives with her for many years, but he is unhappy. One day he goes away and doesn't come back. His body is later found lying by a rock. The tale concludes with the words: "It's a chancy thing to meet her [The Mistress], it brings woe for a bad man, and for a good one there's little joy comes of it".

== Reception and legacy ==
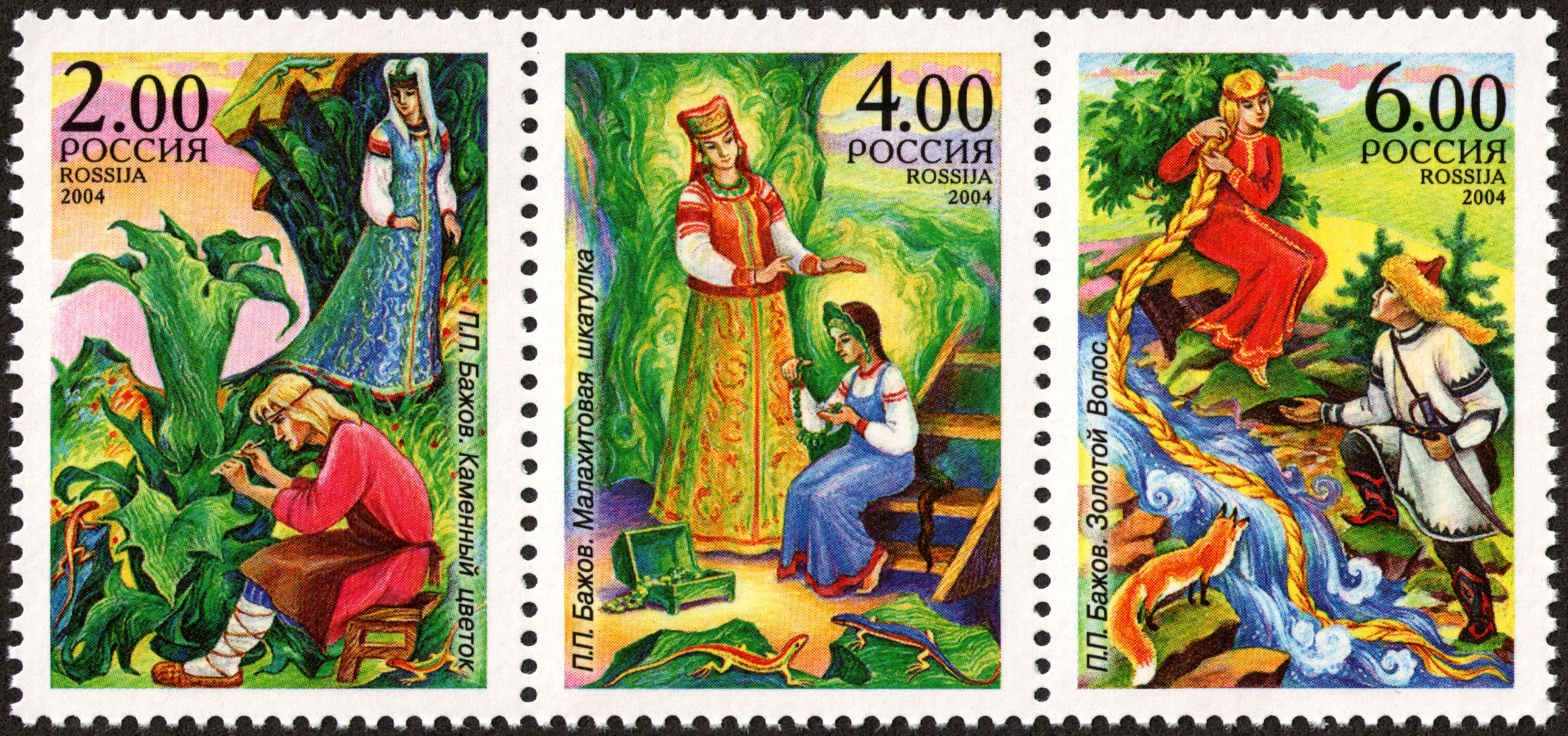
The Mistress of the Copper Mountain and other characters from The Malachite Casket collection in the 2004 Russian stamps (from left to right): Danilo and the Mistress ("The Stone Flower"), the Mistress and Tanyushka ("The Malachite Casket"), and the hunter Ailyp and his ladylove Golden Hair ("Golden Hair").

"The Mistress of the Copper Mountain" is considered to be one of the best stories in The Malachite Casket collection. The Mistress became a popular character in Soviet art. She was recreated on stage, in paintings and sculptures. Many noted the eroticism of the story and questioned whether the characters developed a sexual relationship. The Mistress was interpreted as the manifestation of the female sexuality. "The Mistress exudes sexual attraction and appears as its powerful source". Bazhov confessed that he had heard an "adult" version of the folk tale at the Urals. All sexual references in Pavel Bazhov's stories are very subtle, owing to Soviet puritanism. The style of the story was praised.

During Soviet times, every edition of The Malachite Box was usually prefaced by an essay by a famous writer or scholar, commenting on the creativity of the Ural miners, cruel landlords, social oppression and the "great workers unbroken by the centuries of slavery". The critics focused on the motives of social oppression. The Mistress was presented as the protector of the oppressed. Maya Nikulina comments that one editor wrote that the Casket was given to Stepan to remind him "of hard work and persistence". The later scholars focused more on symbolism, the relationship of the characters with nature, the Mountain and the mysterious in general. Nikulina believed that the Mistress is neither the rescuer nor the defender, does not protect the oppressed, she tests them, and there is not reason to picture her as an advocate of social justice. The landlord is punished for being greedy and stupid, not for being the landlord. Lidiya Slobozhaninova notes that Stepan was not happy after he bought his freedom from the landlord. He should be happily married, but he dies of love and separation, not of unbearable working conditions or severe punishments. Slobozhaninova states that this is not class conflict, but the classical literary conflict between emotions and obligations.

Marina Balina wrote that a contact with the Mistress is a symbolic manifestation of death. As one of the "mountain spirits", she does not hesitate to kill those who did not pass her tests, but even those who had been rewarded by her do not live happily ever after, as shown with Danilo in "The Stone Flower". The Mistress was also interpreted as the manifestation of female sexuality. "The Mistress exudes sexual attraction and appears as its powerful source". Mark Lipovetsky commented that she is the most terrifying characters of the stories. She is a beautiful girl and a demonic dangerous creature at the same time. He claims that she is characterized by three major Freudian motives: the sexual power, the death drive and the castration anxiety (loss of power). She persistently and spitefully provokes the local administration, forcing the protagonist to relay the offensive message.

Yelena Prikazchikova commented that union between the mountain spirit and the mortal is bound to be unhappy, because stone and living matter cannot join.

Denis Zherdev commented that the Mistress of the Copper Mountain's female domain is the world of chaos. Although the characters are so familiar with her that the appearance of the Mistress is regarded as almost natural and even expected, the female domain collides with the ordered factory world, and brings in randomness, variability, unpredictability and capriciousness. Direct contact with the female power is a violation of the world order and therefore brings destruction or chaos. He also pointed out that the most important value in most Bazhov's early stories is family. It serves as the criterion of normality in the characters' lives, e.g. the man who is married lives "correctly". However the family happiness is either flawed, as in this story, unattainable ("Beloved Name", "Yermak's Swans"), or short-lived ("The Twisted Roll", "Sinyushka's Well").

The Mistress appeared in many other tales from The Malachite Casket: "The Malachite Casket", "The Stone Flower", ""The Manager's Boot-Soles"", "Sochen and His Stones", "The Master Craftsman", "The Two Lizards", "A Fragile Twig", "The Grass Hideaway", and "Tayutka's Mirror".

=== Adaptations ===
In 1941 Alexander Fridlender composed the ballet The Mountain Fairy Tale (Russian: Горная сказка, romanized: Gornaja skazka), based on the story.

The animated film The Mistress of the Copper Mountain was released a part of the animated film series made at Sverdlovsk Film Studio from the early 1970s to early 1980s, on time for the 100th anniversary since the birth of Pavel Bazhov. The series included the following films: Sinyushka's Well (1973), The Mistress of the Copper Mountain (1975), The Malachite Casket (1976), The Stone Flower (1977), Podaryonka (based on "Silver Hoof", 1978), Golden Hair (1979), and The Grass Hideaway (1982). This film is a stop motion animated film directed by Oleg Nikolaevsky, with screenplay by A. Dobrovich and Alexander Timofeevsky.

Stepan's Remembrance, a 1976 Soviet film, is the adaptation of the tales "The Mistress of the Copper Mountain" and "The Malachite Casket".

The Stone Flower, a 1946 Soviet film, incorporates plot elements from this story.

The Book of Masters, a 2009 Russian language fantasy film, is loosely based on Bazhov's tales, mostly "The Mistress of the Copper Mountain" and "The Stone Flower".

The 2012 opera The Malachite Casket, based on "The Mistress of the Copper Mountain" and "The Malachite Casket", was created by Dmitry Batin.

== Sources ==
- Bazhov, Pavel (1952). "Ural'skiye skazy" Уральские сказы [Ural tales]. In Bazhova, Valentina A.; Surkov, Alexey A. [in Russian]; Permyak, Evgeny Andreevich [in Russian] (eds.). Sobranie sochinenij v trekh tomakh Собрание сочинений в трех томах [Works. In Three Volumes] (in Russian). Vol. 1. Annotated by Lyudmila I. Skorino. Moscow: Khudozhestvennaya Literatura.
- Bazhov, Pavel Petrovich (1944). The Malachite Casket: tales from the Urals. Library of selected Soviet literature. Translated by Alan Moray Williams. Hutchinson & Co. ltd. ISBN 9787250005603.
- Bazhov, Pavel (1950s). Malachite Casket: Tales from the Urals. Translated by Eve Manning. Moscow: Foreign Languages Publishing House. pdf@archive.org; fulltext@issu.com (restricted access)
- Lipovetsky, Mark (2014). "The Uncanny in Bazhov's Tales". Quaestio Rossica (in Russian). 2 (2). The University of Colorado Boulder: 212–230. doi:10.15826/qr.2014.2.051. hdl:10995/27732. ISSN 2311-911X.
- Nikulina, Maya [in Russian] (2003). "Pro zemelnye dela i pro tajnuju silu. O dalnikh istokakh uralskoj mifologii P.P. Bazhova" Про земельные дела и про тайную силу. О дальних истоках уральской мифологии П.П. Бажова [Of land and the secret force. The distant sources of P.P. Bazhov's Ural mythology]. Filologichesky Klass (in Russian). 9.
