= The Stone Flower (Fridlender) =

The Stone Flower (Russian: Каменный цветок), is a ballet by the Soviet composer Alexander Fridlender, based on the Russian Ural folk tale The Stone Flower by Pavel Bazhov. Iosif Keller wrote the Russian language libretto.

== Background ==
The first version of The Stone Flower was created by the Ural composer Alexander Fridlender in 1944. It premiered at the State Academic Opera and Ballet Theatre in Sverdlovsk. Alexander Fridlender himself was the conductor, with Konstantin Muller as the ballet master, and Vladimir Lyudmilin as the stage manager. It was met with significant praise by critics. Bazhov who was at first sceptical about the ballet adaptations of his stories, watched the ballet and liked it in the end. Another production was made in 1947. Fridlender revised the sheet music, made a lot of changes to the music, scenes, and rewrote the ending of the first act. Emmanuil Krasovitsky was the conductor, Konstantin Muller the ballet master, and Vladimir Lyudmilin the stage manager. Another production was done in 1975, with the ballet master Vitaly Timofeev, the conductor Evgeny Manayev, the artist Nikolay Sitnikov. The Stone Flower is still performed at the Yekaterinburg State Academic Opera and Ballet Theatre.

== Original cast ==
- Nikolay Oreshkevich as Danilo the Craftsman
- Kira Kuzmicheva as Katyenka
- Nina Mladzinskaya as the Mistress of the Copper Mountain
