= The Malachite Casket =

The Malachite Casket may refer to:

- The Malachite Box or The Malachite Casket, a book of fairy tales and folk tales compiled by Pavel Bazhov
- The Malachite Casket (fairy tale), a folk tale of the Ural region
