= List of stories within The Malachite Box =

This is a list of the stories in Pavel Bazhov's collection The Malachite Box. The first edition, released on 28 January 1939, consisted of 14 stories, based on the oral lore of the miners and gold prospectors. After the initial publication, the author continuously added new stories to the collection.

== Key ==
Year	Year of publication
English Title (1944)	Translation by Alan Moray Williams
English Title (1950s)	Translation by Eve Manning
	Indicates the stories that appeared in the first edition of The Malachite Box.

== Chronological list ==
No.	English Title (1944)	English Title (1950s)	Russian Title	Year of publication	First published in	Ref
01	"Beloved Name"	"That Dear Name"	Dorogoe imjachko (Дорогое имячко), lit. "The Dear Name"	1936	Krasnaya Nov (11): pp. 5–9.	
The Cossacks come to the Ural Mountains and are faced with a tribe of the "Old People" who do not know the value of gold.
02	"The Great Snake"	"The Great Serpent"	Pro Velikogo Poloza (Про Великого Полоза), lit. "Of the Great Serpent"	1936	Krasnaya Nov (11): pp. 9–12.	
This skaz introduces Poloz the Great Snake, the master of gold.
03	"The Mistress of the Copper Mountain"	"The Mistress of the Copper Mountain"	Mednoj gory hozjajka (Медной горы хозяйка)	1936	Krasnaya Nov (11): pp. 12–17.	
A young factory worker named Stepan meets the legendary Mistress of the Copper Mountain, the patroness of miners.
04	"The Manager's Boot-Soles"	"The Bailiff's Bootsoles"	Prikazchikovy podoshvy (Приказчиковы подошвы)	1936	Krasnaya Nov (11): pp. 17–20.	
The Mistress of the Copper Mountain punishes the bailiff for his cruelty.
05	"Sochen and His Stones"	"Sochen's Gems"	Sochnevy kameshki (Сочневы камешки), lit. "Sochen's Stones"	1937	The Literary Almanac, Volume 3 (Sverdlovsk): pp. 185–191.	
A greedy miner, Vanka Sochen, searches for the Mistress of the Copper Mountain's rare gemstones. The Mistress appears before him and allows to gather some stones provided that he will bring them directly to the bailiff. When Sochen gets to the bailiff and opens his bag, there are no gemstones there.
06	"Marko's Hill"	"Mark's Stone"	Markov kamen (Марков камень), lit. "Mark's Stone"	1937	The Literary Almanac, Volume 3 (Sverdlovsk): pp. 191–195.	
A rich, promiscuous woman gets interested in a young worker named Mark, who is already married to Tatyana.
07	"The Stone Flower"	"The Flower of Stone"	Kamennyj tsvetok (Каменный цветок)	1938	Literaturnaya Gazeta (10 May 1938); Uralsky Sovremennik (1)	
A talented stone-craftsman, Danilo, finds out about the beautiful Stone Flower that grows in the domain of the Mistress of the Copper Mountain.
08	"The Malachite Casket"	"The Malachite Casket"	Malahitovaja shkatulka (Малахитовая шкатулка)	1938	Na Smenu! (Sep–Nov 1938); Uralsky Sovremennik (1)	
Stepan's daughter Tanyushka inherits the Mistress's Malachite Casket.
09	"Silver Hoof"	"Silver Hoof"	Serebrjanoe kopyttse (Серебряное копытце), lit. "Small Silver Hoof"	1938	Uralsky Sovremennik almanac (2): pp. 102–105	
An old man, Kokovanya, and an orphan girl, Daryonka, find the grey goat Silver Hoof, who stamps with his silver hoof and leaves chrysolites on the ground.
10	"The Demidov Caftans"	—	Demidovskie kaftany (Демидовские кафтаны), lit. "Demidov's Caftans"	1938	Svetloye Ozero collection (Sverdlovsk)	
It was first published as "The Tale of Itkul" (Russian: Сказ про Иткуль, romanized: Skaz pro Itkul). This is one of the few stories that are based on the Bashkir folklore.
11	—		Nadpis na kamne (Надпись на камне), lit. "The Writing on the Stone"	1938	Industria Sotsialisma (11); Svetloye Ozero collection (Sverdlovsk): pp. 8–16	
12	"The Master Craftsman"	"The Mountain Craftsman"	Gornyj master (Горный мастер), lit. "The Mountain Craftsman"	1939	Na Smenu! (14-26 Jan 1939); Oktyabr (5/6): pp. 172–178	
After Danilo the Craftsman leaves the village for the Mistress of the Copper Mountain's domain, Katyenka, his betrothed, moves in into his former house. She learns stonecraft from Danilo's old teacher Prokopich. After his death she starts working as a craftsman. One day she meets the Mistress and asks her to return Danilo to her. The Mistress arranges a meeting between them and presents Danilo with a choice: "If you go with her you forget all that is mine, if you remain here, then you must forget her and all living people". Danilo chooses to return to the village, saying that he remembers Katyenka every minute.
13	"The Twisted Roll"	—	Tjazhjolaja vitushka (Тяжёлая витушка), lit. "The Heavy Сurl"	1939	Zolotye Zyorna children's almanac (Sverdlovsk); Industria Sotsialisma (1): pp. 25–27.	
14	"Golden Hair"	—	Zolotoj volos (Золотой волос), lit. "A Golden Hair"	1939	Zolotye Zyorna children's almanac (Sverdlovsk)	
A daring hunter, Ailyp, snatches his ladylove Golden Hair away from her father, Poloz the Great Snake.
15	"Sinyushka's Well"	"The Blue Crone's Spring"	Sinjushkin kolodets (Синюшкин колодец), lit. "Sinyushka's Water Well"	1939	Moscow Almanac: pp. 256–266.	
16	"The Two Lizards"	—	Dve jashherki (Две ящерки)	1939	Oktyabr (5/6): pp. 159–166.	
17	"The Cat's Ears"	"Cat's Ears"	Koshachyi ushi (Кошачьи уши)	1939	Industria Sotsialisma (2): pp. 18–22; Oktyabr (5/6): pp. 166–172.	
Men start disappearing from the factory on their way to Sysert, and a young brave girl, Dunyakha, goes looking for them. Unfortunately that area is packed with wolves. One of the Sysert miners tells Dunyakha that there might be a safe passage near the Galyan swamp, because "The Earth Cat roams from Galyan to Dumnaya". The Earth Cat, a creature with fiery ears that lives in the sands where copper mixes with gold, doesn't harm people, but wolves are afraid of it. Dunyakha does as she is told. Once the wolves start surrounding her, she sees two blow ? flames that look like cat's ears. She realizes that they are The Earth Cat's ears, and the Cat itself moves beneath the ground. Dunyakha follows the flames and that decision saves her life.
18	"The Snake Trail"	"The Serpent's Trail"	Zmeinyj sled (Змеиный след), lit. "The Snake Trail"	1939	Oktyabr (5/6): pp. 178–184.	
It continues the story of the two brothers from "The Great Snake".
19	—		Travjanaja zapadenka (Травяная западенка), lit. "The Grass Hideaway"	1940	Industria Sotsialisma (1): pp. 29–33.	
20	—		Yermakovy lebedi (Ермаковы лебеди), lit. "Yermak's Swans"	1940	Tekhnika Smene (9, 10, 11)	
21	"The Key-Stone"	"The Key to the Earth"	Kljuch zemli (Ключ земли), lit. "The Key of the Earth"	1940	Uralsky Rabochy (1 Jan 1940)	
It was first published as "The Key Stone" (Russian: Ключ-камень, romanized: Kljuch-kamen).
22	"The Fire-Fairy"	"The Dancing Fire Maid"	Ognevushka-poskakushka (Огневушка-поскакушка), lit. "The Jumping Fire Girl"	1940	children's anthology Morozko; Vskhody Komunny (5-17 Mar 1940)	
The Fire-Fairy helps shows herself to the eight-year-old boy Fedyunka and the old gold prospector Yefim. The Fire Maid, who shows herself only if there's gold in that place, helps them to find gold and live in wealth for many years.
23	—	"A Fragile Twig"	Hrupkaja vetochka (Хрупкая веточка)	1940	Uralsky Rabochy (22 Sep 1940)	
The main character of the skaz is the son of Katyenka and Danilo the Craftsman from "The Stone Flower" and "The Mountain Craftsman". Katyenka marries Danilo and gives birth to eight boys. When the landlord doubles the family's quit-rent, the third son Mitya becomes a stone craftsman. He proves to be a talented worker, quickly surpassing his teacher. One day he decides to make a tree branch from inexpensive stone (mostly serpentine), drawing inspiration from a gooseberry bush. The resulting gooseberry twig looks incredibly well-made and lifelike, and the landlord wants it for his daughter. He takes it by force, but quickly finds out that Mitya used the cheapest of stones for it. The landlord feels offended that the serpentine would touch his daughter and steps on the twig, crushing it to dust. Mitya disappears from the village.
24	—		Tajutkino zerkaltse (Таюткино зеркальце), lit. "Tayutka's Mirror"	1941	Uralsky Rabochy (30 Mar 1941)	
25	—		Solnechnyj kamen (Солнечный камень), lit. "The Sunstone"	1942	Uralsky Rabochy (21 Jan 1942)	
26	—		Ivanko Krylatko (Иванко-Крылатко)	1942	Uralsky Sovremennik (6): pp. 58–63.	
27	—	"Zhelezko's Covers"	Zhelezkovy pokryshki (Железковы покрышки)	1942	Govorit Ural collection: pp. 125–132.	
28	—		Veselukhin lozhok (Веселухин ложок), lit. "Veselukha's Meadow"	1943	Skazy o Nemtsakh collection (Sverdlovsk Publishing House); Novy Mir (1): pp. 78–84.	
The smiling maiden Veselukha, who can be found on the blossoming meadow, can treat the miner to a glass of wine and help the master with a beautiful pattern. However, she is very unwelcoming towards strangers.
29	—		Chugunnaja babushka (Чугунная бабушка), lit. "The Cast Iron Granny"	1943	V Boy Za Rodinu! (Karelsy Front) (8 Feb); Chelyabinsky Rabochy (7 Nov 1943)	
The protagonist is Vasily Torokin, the real worker from the Kaslinsky Plant.
30	—		Khrustalnyj lak (Хрустальный лак), lit. "Crystal Varnish"	1943	Literaturny Utal (12 Jul 1943)	
31	—		Tarakanye mylo (Тараканье мыло), lit. "Cockroach Soap"	1943	Ogoniok (34-35); Vo Slavu Otchizny collection (Chelyabinsk)	
32	—	"That Spark of Life"	Zhivinka v dele (Живинка в деле)	1943	Krasny Borets (17 Oct); Uralsky Rabochy (27 Oct)	
The talented worker Timokha Maloruchko decides to try every single craft.
33	—		Bogatyrjova rukavitsa (Богатырёва рукавица), lit. "The Bogatyr's Glove"	1944	Uralsky Rabochy (21 Jan 1944); Novy Mir (8/9): pp. 67–69.	
34	—		Krugovoj fonar (Круговой фонарь), lit. "The Round Lantern"	1944	Uralsky Rabochy (7 Nov 1944); Chelyabinsky Rabochy (10 Jan 1945)	
35	—		Korennaja tajnost (Коренная тайность)	1945	Krasnoflotets (1): pp. 16–19; Uralsky Rabochy (10 Nov 1945)	
The characters are real historical figures, the talented Russian metallurgist P. Anosov and his assistant N. Shvetsov.
36	—	"The Eagle's Feather"	Orlinoe pero (Орлиное перо)	1945	Krasny Boets; Uralsky Rabochy (21 Apr 1945)	
37	—		Zolotye dajki (Золотые дайки), lit. "Dikes of Gold"	1945	Uralsky Rabochy (7 Oct 1945); Novy Mir (8): pp. 77–83.	
38	—	"The Blue Snake"	Golubaja zmejka (Голубая змейка)	1945	Murzilka (9-10): pp. 8–12.	
39	—		Vasina gora (Васина гора), lit. "Vasya's Mountain"	1946	Molodoy Kolkhoznik (1); Uralsky Rabochy (5 Mar); Golos Kolkhoznika (22 Aug 1946)	
40	—		Dalevoe gljadeltse (Далевое глядельце)	1946	Uralsky Rabochy (7 Nov); Ogoniok (1). 1947	
41	—		Ametistovoe delo (Аметистовое дело)	1947	Uralsky Rabochy (1 May 1947); Ogoniok (30)	
42	—		Rudjanoj pereval (Рудяной перевал), lit. "The Ore Pass"	1947	Krasnaya Zvezda (19 Oct 1947)	
It was first published as "The Ore Whirlwinds" (Russian: Рудяные вихорьки, romanized: Rudjanye vikhorki).
43	—		Shelkovaja gorka (Шёлковая горка)	1947	Uralsky Rabochy (7 Nov 1947)	
44	—		Shirokoe plecho (Широкое плечо), lit. "A Wide Shoulder"	1948	Ogoniok (26); Uralsky Rabochy (1 Apr 1948)	
45	—		Dorogoj zemli vitok (Дорогой земли виток), lit. "A Piece of The Dear Land"	1948	Ogoniok (17): pp. 20–22; Uralsky Sovremennik (15): 3–12. 1949	
46	—	"Zhabrei's Path"	Zhabrejev khodok (Жабреев ходок)	1951	Boevye Rebyata (13): pp. 11–21.	

== Sources ==
- Bazhov, Pavel (1976). Works. In Three Volumes (in Russian). Vol. 1. Moscow: Pravda.
- Bazhov, Pavel (1952). Valentina Bazhova; Alexey Surkov; Yevgeny Permyak (eds.). Works. In Three Volumes (in Russian). Vol. 1. Moscow: Khudozhestvennaya Literatura.
- Bazhov, Pavel (1952). Valentina Bazhova; Alexey Surkov; Yevgeny Permyak (eds.). Works. In Three Volumes (in Russian). Vol. 2. Moscow: Khudozhestvennaya Literatura.
- Bazhov, Pavel (1944). The Malachite Casket: tales from the Urals. Library of selected Soviet literature. Translated by Williams, Alan Moray. The University of California: Hutchinson & Co. ltd. OCLC 1998181.
- Bazhov, Pavel; Eve Manning, transl. (1950s). Malachite Casket: Tales from the Urals. Moscow: Foreign Languages Publishing House.
