= The Stone Flower =

- Short story by Pavel Bazhov
- Original title: Каменный цветок
- Translator: Alan Moray Williams (first), Eve Manning, et al.
- Country: Soviet Union
- Language: Russian
- Genre: skaz

Publication
- Published in: Literaturnaya Gazeta
- Publication type: Periodical
- Publisher: The Union of Soviet Writers
- Media type: Print (newspaper, hardback and paperback)
- Publication date: 10 May 1938

Chronology
- Series: The Malachite Casket collection (list of stories)
Marko's Hill	—

"The Stone Flower" (Russian: Каменный цветок, romanized: Kamennyj tsvetok, IPA: [ˈkamʲɪnːɨj tsvʲɪˈtok]), also known as "The Flower of Stone", is a folk tale (also known as skaz) of the Ural region of Russia collected and reworked by Pavel Bazhov, and published in Literaturnaya Gazeta on 10 May 1938 and in Uralsky Sovremennik. It was later released as a part of the story collection The Malachite Box. "The Stone Flower" is considered to be one of the best stories in the collection. The story was translated from Russian into English by Alan Moray Williams in 1944, and several times after that.

Pavel Bazhov indicated that all his stories can be divided into two groups based on tone: "child-toned" (e.g. "Silver Hoof") with simple plots, children as the main characters, and a happy ending, and "adult-toned". He called "The Stone Flower" the "adult-toned" story.

The tale is told from the point of view of the imaginary Grandpa Slyshko (Russian: Дед Слышко, romanized: Ded Slyshko; lit. "Old Man Listenhere").

== Publication ==
The Moscow critic Viktor Pertsov read the manuscript of "The Stone Flower" in the spring of 1938, when he traveled across the Urals with his literary lectures. He was very impressed by it and published an abridged version of the story in Literaturnaya Gazeta on 10 May 1938. His complimenting review The fairy tales of the Old Urals (Russian: Сказки старого Урала, romanized: Skazki starogo Urala) accompanied the publication.

After the appearance in Literaturnaya Gazeta, the story was published in first volume of the Uralsky Sovremennik in 1938. It was later released as a part of Malachite Box collection on 28 January 1939.

In 1944 the story was translated from Russian into English by Alan Moray Williams and published by Hutchinson as a part of the collection The Malachite Casket: Tales from the Urals. The title was translated as "The Stone Flower". In the 1950s a translation of The Malachite Casket was published by Eve Manning and the story was called "The Flower of Stone". The story was again published in the collection Russian Magic Tales from Pushkin to Platonov by Penguin Books in 2012. The title was translated by Anna Gunin as "The Stone Flower".

== Plot summary ==
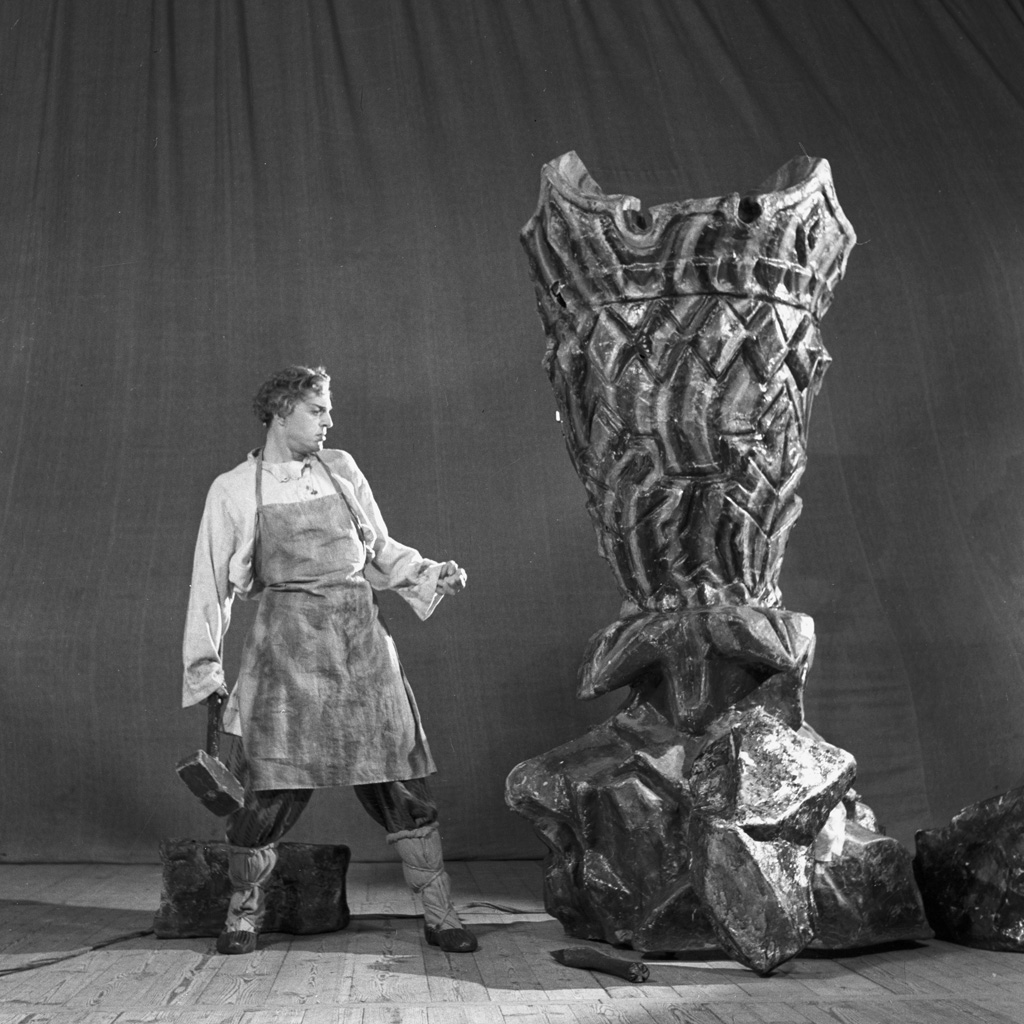
Vladimir Preobrazhensky as Danilo in the ballet The Tale of the Stone Flower, 1 March 1954.

The main character of the story, Danilo, is a weakling and a scatterbrain, and people from the village find him strange. He is sent to study under the stone-craftsman Prokopich. One day he is given an order to make a fine-molded cup, which he creates after a thornapple. It turns out smooth and neat, but not beautiful enough for Danilo's liking. He is dissatisfied with the result. He says that even the simplest flower "brings joy to your heart", but his stone cup will bring joy to no one. Danilo feels as if he just spoils the stone. An old man tells him the legend that a most beautiful Stone Flower grows in the domain of the Mistress of the Copper Mountain, and those who see it start to understand the beauty of stone, but "life loses all its sweetness" for them. They become the Mistress's mountain craftsmen forever. Danilo's fiancée Katyenka asks him to forget it, but Danilo longs to see the Flower. He goes to the copper mine and finds the Mistress of the Copper Mountain. He begs her to show him the Flower. The Mistress reminds him of his fiancée and warns Danilo that he would never want to go back to his people, but he insists. She then shows him the Malachite Flower. Danilo goes back to the village, destroys his stone cup and then disappears. "Some said he'd taken leave of his senses and died somewhere in the woods, but others said the Mistress had taken him to her mountain workshop forever".

== Sources ==
The main character of the story, Danilo the Craftsman, was based on the real miner Danila Zverev (Russian: Данила Кондратьевич Зверев, romanized: Danila Kondratyevich Zverev; 1858–1938). Bazhov met him at the lapidary studio in Sverdlovsk. Zverev was born, grew up and spent most of his life in Koltashi village, Rezhevsky District. Before the October Revolution Zverev moved to Yekaterinburg, where he took up gemstone assessment. Bazhov later created another skaz about his life, "Dalevoe glyadeltse". Danila Zverev and Danilo the Craftsman share many common traits, e.g. both lost their parents early, both tended cattle and were punished for their dreaminess, both suffered from poor health since childhood. Danila Zverev was so short and thin that the villagers gave him the nickname "Lyogonkiy" (Russian: Лёгонький, lit. '"Lightweight"'). Danilo from the story had another nickname "Nedokormysh" (Russian: Недокормыш, lit. '"Underfed" or "Famished"'). Danila Zverev's teacher Samoil Prokofyich Yuzhakov (Russian: Самоил Прокофьич Южаков) became the source of inpisration for Danilo the Craftsman's old teacher Prokopich.

== Themes ==
During Soviet times, every edition of The Malachite Box was usually prefaced by an essay by a famous writer or scholar, commenting on the creativity of the Ural miners, cruel landlords, social oppression and the "great workers unbroken by the centuries of slavery". The later scholars focused more on the relationship of the characters with nature, the Mountain and the mysterious in general. Maya Nikulina comments that Danilo is the creator who is absolutely free from all ideological, social and political contexts. His talent comes from the connection with the secret force, which controls all his movements. Moreover, the local landlord, while he exists, is unimportant for Danilo's story. Danilo's issues with his employer are purely aesthetic, i.e., a custom-made vase was ordered, but Danilo, as an artist, only desires to understand the beauty of stone, and this desire takes him away from life.

The Stone Flower is the embodiment of the absolute magic power of stone and the absolute beauty, which is beyond mortals' reach.

Many noted that the Mistress' world represents the realm of the dead, which is emphasized not only by its location underneath the human world but also mostly by its mirror-like, uncanny, imitation or negation of the living world. Everything looks strange there, even the trees are cold and smooth like stone. The Mistress herself does not eat or drink, she does not leave any traces, her clothing is made of stone and so on. The Mountain connects her to the world of the living, and Danilo metaphorically died for the world, when we went to her. Mesmerized by the Flower, Danilo feels at his own wedding as if he were at a funeral. A contact with the Mistress is a symbolic manifestation of death. Marina Balina noted that as one of the "mountain spirits", she does not hesitate to kill those who did not pass her tests, but even those who had been rewarded by her do not live happily ever after, as shown with Stepan in "The Mistress of the Copper Mountain". The Mistress was also interpreted as the manifestation of female sexuality. "The Mistress exudes sexual attraction and appears as its powerful source". Mark Lipovetsky commented that Mistress embodies the struggle and unity between Eros and Thanatos. The Flower is made of cold stone for that very reason: it points at death along with sexuality. All sexual references in Pavel Bazhov's stories are very subtle, owing to Soviet puritanism.

Danilo is a classical Bazhov binary character. On the one hand, he is a truth seeker and a talented craftsman, on the other hand, he is an outsider, who violates social norms, destroys the lives of the loved ones and his own. The author of The Fairy Tale Encyclopedia suggests that the Mistress represents the conflict between human kind and nature. She compares the character with Mephistopheles, because a human needs to wager his soul with the Mistress in order to get the ultimate knowledge. Danilo wagers his soul for exceptional craftsmanship skills. However, the Mistress does not force anyone to abandon their moral values, and therefore "is not painted in dark colours". Lyudmila Skorino believed that she represented the nature of the Urals, which inspires a creative person with its beauty.

Denis Zherdev commented that the Mistress's female domain is the world of chaos, destruction and spontaneous uncontrolled acts of creation (human craftsmen are needed for the controlled creation). Although the characters are so familiar with the female world that the appearance of the Mistress is regarded as almost natural and even expected, the female domain collides with the ordered factory world, and brings in randomness, variability, unpredictability and capriciousness. Direct contact with the female power is a violation of the world order and therefore brings destruction or chaos.

One of the themes is how to become a true artist and the subsequent self-fulfillment. The Soviet critics' point of view was that the drama of Danilo came from the fact that he was a serf, and therefore did not receive the necessary training to complete the task. However, modern critics disagree and state that the plot of the artist's dissatisfaction is very popular in literature. Just like in the Russian poem The Sylph, written by Vladimir Odoyevsky, Bazhov raises the issue that the artist can reach his ideal only when he comes in with the otherworldly.

== Sequels ==
=== "The Master Craftsman" ===
"The Master Craftsman" (Russian: Горный мастер, romanized: Gornyj master) was serialized in Na Smenu! from 14 to 26 January 1939, in Oktyabr (issues 5–6), and in Rabotnitsa magazine (issues 18–19). In 1944 the story was translated from Russian into English by Alan Moray Williams and published by Hutchinson as a part of the collection The Malachite Casket: Tales from the Urals. The title was translated as "The Master Craftsman". In the 1950s translation of The Malachite Casket, made by Eve Manning, the story was published as "The Mountain Craftsman". The story was published in the collection Russian Magic Tales from Pushkin to Platonov, published by Penguin Books in 2012. The title was translated by Anna Gunin as "The Mountain Master".

The story begins after the disappearance of Danilo. For several years Danilo's betrothed Katyenka (Katya) waits for him and stays unmarried despite the fact that everyone laughs at her. She is the only person who believes that Danilo will return. She is quickly nicknamed "Dead Man's Bride". When both of her parents die, she moves away from her family and goes to Danilo's house and takes care of his old teacher Prokopich, although she knows that living with a man can ruin her reputation. Prokopich welcomes her happily. He earns some money by gem-cutting, Katya runs the house, cooks, and does the gardening. When Prokopich gets too old to work, Katya realizes that she cannot possibly support herself by needlework alone. She asks him to teach her some stone craft. Prokopich laughs at first, because he does not believe gem-cutting is a suitable job for a woman, but soon relents. He teaches her how to work with malachite. After he dies, Katya decides to live in the house alone. Her strange behaviour, her refusal to marry someone and lead a normal life, cause people at the village to think that she is insane or even a witch, but Katya firmly believes that Danilo will "learn all he wants to know, there in the mountain, and then he'll come". She wants to try making medallions and selling them. There are no gemstones left, so she goes to the forest, finds an exceptional piece of gemstone and starts working. After the medallions are finished, she goes to the town to the merchant who used to buy Prokopich's work. He reluctantly buys them all, because her work is very beautiful. Katya feels as if this was a token from Danilo. She runs back to the forest and starts calling for him. The Mistress of the Copper Mountain appears. Katya bravely demands that she gives Danilo back. The Mistress takes her to Danilo and says: "Well, Danilo the Master Craftsman, now you must choose. If you go with her you forget all that is mine, if you remain here, then you must forget her and all living people". Danilo chooses Katya, saying that he thinks about her every moment. The Mistress is pleased with Katya's bravery and rewards her by letting Danilo remember everything that he had learned in the Mountain. She then warns Danilo to never tell anyone about his life there. The couple thanks the Mistress and goes back to the village. When asked about his disappearance, Danilo claims that he simply left to Kolyvan to train under another craftsman. He marries Katya. His work is extraordinary, and everyone starts calling him "the mountain craftsman".

=== Other books ===
This family's story continues in "A Fragile Twig", published in 1940. "A Fragile Twig" focuses on Katyenka and Danilo's son Mitya. This is the last tale about Danilo's family. Bazhov had plans for the fourth story about Danilo's family, but it was never written. In the interview to a Soviet newspaper Vechernyaya Moskva the writer said: "I am going to finish "The Stone Flower" story. I would like to write about the heirs of the protagonist, Danilo, [I would like] to write about their remarkable skills and aspirations for the future. I'm thinking about leading the story to the present day". This plan was later abandoned.

== Reception and legacy ==
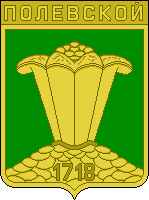
The Stone Flower in the early design of Polevskoy's coat of arms (1981).

The current flag of Polevskoy features the Mistress of the Copper Mountain (depicted as a lizard) inside the symbolic representation of the Stone Flower.

Danilo the Craftsman became one of the best known characters of Bazhov's tales. The fairy tale inspired numerous adaptations, including films and stage adaptations. It is included in the school reading curriculum. "The Stone Flower" is typically adapted with "The Master Craftsman".

- The Stone Flower Fountain at the VDNKh Center, Moscow (1953).
- The Stone Flower Fountain in Yekaterinburg (1960). Project by Pyotr Demintsev.

It generated a Russian catchphrase "How did that Stone Flower come out?" (Russian: "Не выходит у тебя Каменный цветок?", romanized: Ne vykhodit u tebja Kamennyj tsvetok?, lit. "Naught came of your Stone Flower?"), derived from these dialogue:

"Well, Danilo the Craftsman, so naught came of your thornapple?"
"No, naught came of it," he said.

The style of the story was praised.

=== Films ===
- The Stone Flower, a 1946 Soviet film; incorporates plot elements from the stories "The Mistress of the Copper Mountain" and "The Master Craftsman".
- The Stone Flower, a 1977 animated film; based on "The Stone Flower" and "The Master Craftsman"
- The Master Craftsman, a 1978 animated film made by Soyuzmultfilm studio, based on "The Stone Flower" and "The Master Craftsman".
- The Book of Masters, a 2009 Russian language fantasy film, is loosely based on Bazhov's tales, including "The Stone Flower".
- The Stone Flower (another title: Skazy), a television film of two-episodes that premiered on 1 January 1988. This film is a photoplay (a theatrical play that has been filmed for showing as a film) based on the 1987 play of the Maly Theatre. It was directed by Vitaly Ivanov, with the music composed by Nikolai Karetnikov, and released by Studio Ekran. It starred Yevgeny Samoylov, Tatyana Lebedeva, Tatyana Pankova, Oleg Kutsenko.

=== Theatre, opera, and dance ===
- The Stone Flower, the 1944 ballet composed by Alexander Fridlender.
- Klavdiya Filippova combined "The Stone Flower" with "The Master Craftsman" to create the children's play The Stone Flower. It was published in Sverdlovsk as a part of the 1949 collection Plays for Children's Theatre Based on Bazhov's Stories.
- The Stone Flower, an opera in four acts by Kirill Molchanov. Sergey Severtsev wrote the Russian language libretto. It was the first opera of Molchanov. It premiered on 10 December 1950 in Moscow at the Stanislavski and Nemirovich-Danchenko Music Theatre. The role of Danila (tenor) was sung by Mechislav Shchavinsky, Larisa Adveyeva sung the Mistress of the Copper Mountain (mezzo-soprano), Dina Potapovskaya sung Katya (coloratura soprano).
- The Tale of the Stone Flower, the 1954 ballet composed by Sergei Prokofiev.
- Skazy, also called The Stone Flower, the 1987 play of the Maly Theatre.
