= The Mistress of the Copper Mountain =

Character in Slavic mythology

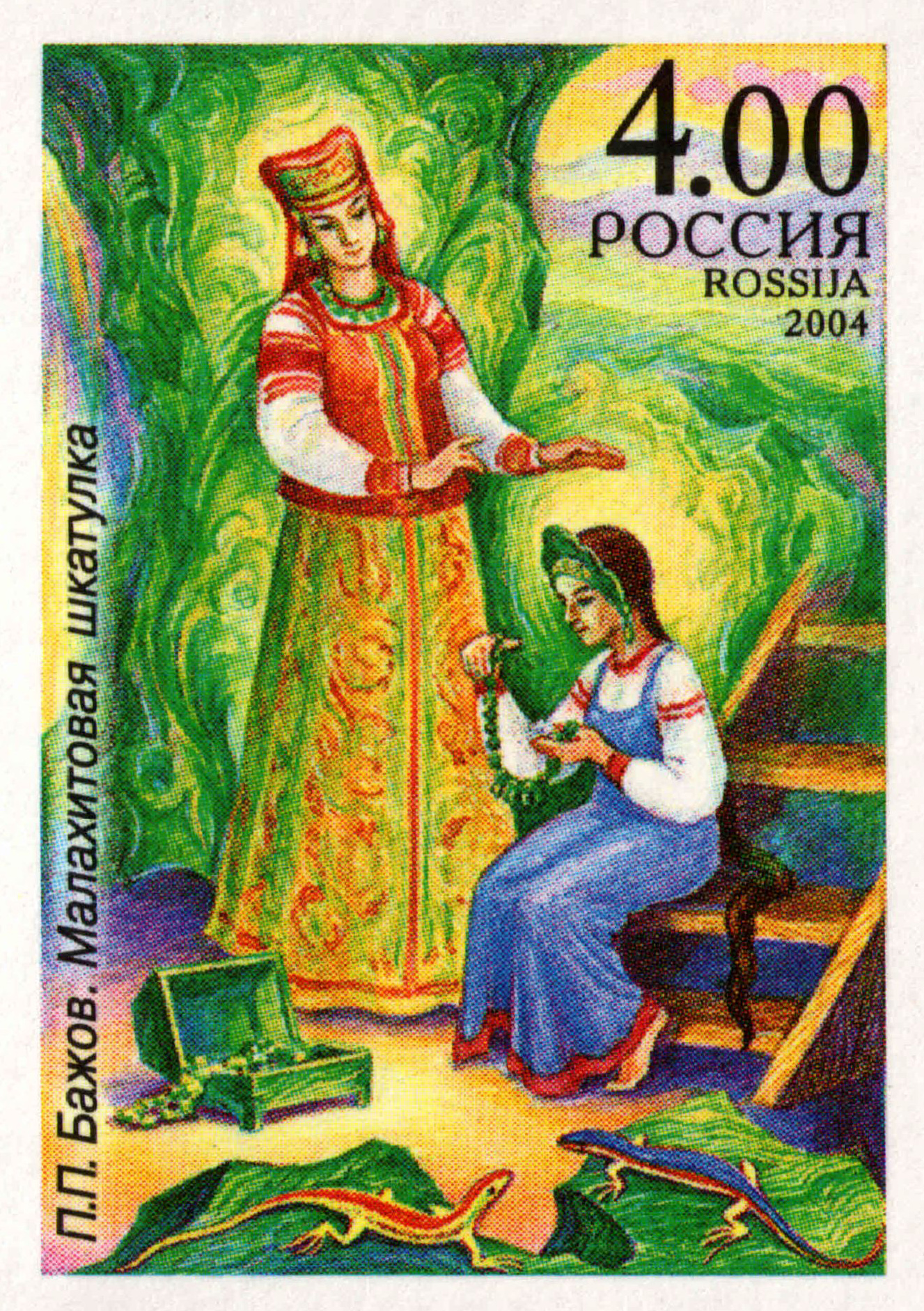
The Mistress of the Copper Mountain and Tanyushka

The coat of arms of Polevskoy (from left to right): the Venus symbol (♀), which represents the chemical element copper and was the brand of the Polevskoy Copper Smelting Plant, the Mistress of the Copper Mountain depicted as the golden lizard, and the eight-pointed star, the brand of the Seversky Pipe Plant.

The Mistress of the Copper Mountain (Russian: Хозяйка медной горы, romanized: Khozyaika mednoi gory; (Note: Also transcribable as Hozjajka mednoj gory or given in transposed form as: Медной горы хозяйка; Mednoy gory khozyayka.)), also known as The Malachite Maid (Russian: Малахитница, romanized: Malakhitnitsa), is a legendary being of the Ural miners, said to be the Mistress of the Ural Mountains of Russia. A character of Slavic mythology and Russian fairy tales.

In folklore or legend, she is depicted as an extremely beautiful green-eyed young woman in a malachite gown or as a lizard. She has been viewed as the patroness (Note: покровительница "patroness" but not in the financial backer sense, but rather a patron deity.) of miners, the protector and owner of hidden underground riches, the one who can either permit or prevent the mining of stones and metals in certain places.

"The Copper Mountain" is the Gumyoshevsky mine, the oldest mine of the Ural Mountains, which was called "The Copper Mountain" or simply "The Mountain" by the populace. It is now located in the town of Polevskoy, Sverdlovsk Oblast. In some regions of the Ural Mountains, the image of the Mistress is connected (or equated) with another female creature from the local folktales, the Azov Girl (Азовка; Azovka), the enchanted girl or princess who lives inside Mount Azov.

The Mistress of the Copper Mountain became a well known character from her appearance in Pavel Bazhov's collection of Ural Mountains folktales (also known as skaz) under the title The Malachite Box. The Mistress appears in the third skaz, "The Mistress of the Copper Mountain", and in 9 other stories from the collection, including "The Stone Flower", "The Manager's Boot-Soles", and "Sochen and His Stones".

== Characteristics ==
The Mistress of the Copper Mountain has the appearance of an extremely beautiful young woman with green eyes (or sometimes a mature woman, though unmarried, as indicated by her unscarved hair). Some of her more distinctive features include dark braided hair, ribbons from thin tinkling copper, and a gown that is made from malachite. She wears a diadem decorated with malachite and precious stones. The mistress can appear as a lizard herself, sometimes wearing a crown, and has the mountain lizards under her command. She may also assume the form of a snake, though the giant snake master is also familiarly embodied by Poloz (cf. the tale "The Great Snake"). (Note: While Полоз "Poloz" is employed like a proper name,полоз to types of snakes. The term generally refers to the "racer" snake (Coluber spp.) but will include reclassified species, e.g.,Узорчатый полоз being the steppe rat snake (formerly Coluber dione now Elaphe dione).)

As a mountain spirit, she is the protector and owner of hidden underground riches. She is said to be always surrounded by her servants, small lizards, which can be green, of various hues of blue, golden-speckled, glittering like mica, or patterned. (Note: In the tale "The Mistress of the Copper Mountain", she had around her lizards of many sorts and "Одни, например, зеленые, другие голубые, которые в синь впадают, а то как глина либо песок с золотыми крапинками. Одни, как стекло либо слюда, блестят, а другие, как трава поблеклая, а которые опять узорами изукрашены, translated as "Some were green, and some light blue, and some dark blue, every shade and colour, and some were like clay or sand with golden specks. And some shone like glass or mica, and some were like withered grass and some had all sorts of patterns on them".) According to legend, a person who sees the Mistress comes under her spell. She shows kindness to good people and skilled craftsmen, helping them to find jewels and gold, but if her conditions aren't met, the person loses all his luck and skill, and can even die. She could permit or prevent mining in certain places, give or take wealth, and sometimes employs lizards under her control as her minions to conduct her work. Thus miners for malachite considered their finds to be owing to her blessing, and if they suffered a streak over time not finding any, they suspected they have incurred their wrath. In the Urals it was assumed she only favored those people who were good, honest, and hard-working, or workers who are brave and freedom-loving, tending to be hostile to the aristocracy.

The sacral being, the Mistress was surrounded by rituals and taboos, e.g. women did not come down in the mine, because it was the Mistress's domain, and young men seeking her patronage did not marry. The violation of the taboos was supposed to bring a harsh punishment. Children were taught not to shout and quarrel next to the stones, and to keep quiet in the mines, because, according to popular belief, the Maid disliked loud noises. Her distinguishing attributes were lizards, copper and malachite.

== Other names ==
The Mistress of the Copper Mountain may be called just "The Mistress of the Mountain", and also has many other names, such as The Mountain Mother (Горная матка, Gornaja matka), The Golden Woman (Золотая баба, Zolotaya baba), The Stone Maiden (Каменная девка, Kamennaja devka), or The Stone Girl The Malachite Girl, The Malachite Maid or The Malachite Lady (Малахитница, Malakhitnitsa), The Serpent Mistress, The Lizard Queen, etc. It has been claimed that because the Mistress is so powerful and dreadful, she has not been named directly by the miners, who say "it was she herself" (сама это). (Note: Zherdev (2003), p. 54, quoting "Manager's Boot-Soles" at Bazhov & Manning tr. (1950s), p. 115)

=== The Azov Girl ===
In many national folktales, the Mistress and Azovka (lit. "the Azov Girl") are identical with each other, and the same stories are told about each of them. The Azov Girl may also be a sort of underling of the Mistress of the Mountain (rather akin to the army of lizards under the Mistress's command). However, the Azov Girl seems to have an independent identity unconnected to the Mistress of the Mountain, this despite the fact that Azov Girl is certainly the guardian of minable treasure (gold, etc.), and not of weapons or other goods.

The tales about Azovka are very different from one another, although they share some common characteristics. Firstly, that there's a cave with hidden treasures inside Mount Azov. Secondly, few people found the cave, and no one could get the treasures. The treasures belong to the Tatars, the Bashkirs, or "the Old People". (Note: By the "Old People" (старые люди), Bazhov refers to the aborigines of the Urals.) According to popular belief, Azovka lives/is held captive inside the cave (or the mountain), and she guards the treasures. In most tales, she is the enchanted girl, possibly stolen by the Tatars, the cursed Tatar princess, the Old People's queen or their elder's daughter.

== Appearances in works ==
=== In The Malachite Box ===
The Mistress of the Copper Mountain appears in the third Pavel Bazhov's skaz from The Malachite Box, "The Mistress of the Copper Mountain", first published in the 11th issue of Krasnaya Nov in 1936; and then in many other tales: "The Malachite Casket", "The Stone Flower", "The Manager's Boot-Soles", "Sochen and His Stones", "The Master Craftsman", "The Two Lizards", "A Fragile Twig", "The Grass Hideaway", and "Tayutka's Mirror". Bazhov confirmed that he based the character on local legends. He said: "Yes, I believe that the series of tales connected with the Gumyoshevsky mine is closer to folklore. In my opinion, they represent the attempt to reconstruct the folklore of this mine". When asked whether the character from his writing differs from its folklore interpretation, Bazhov replied: "I don't believe there is a difference. If there is, it is bad [news]".

In "The Mistress of the Copper Mountain" she is described as follows:

You could see from her plait she was a maid. It was a sort of deep black, that plait of hers, and didn't dangle as our maids' do, but lay close and straight down her back. (Note: The original Russian ссиза-черная is literally "bluish-black", and Williams tr. (1944) gives "This plait was of a bluish-black colour and not hanging loose, as with our girls, but stuck to her back, as it were".) And the ribbons at the end weren't quite red and weren't quite green, they'd something of both. You could see the light shining through them and they seemed to click a little, like thin leaves of copper. [...] She was not very tall, with a pretty figure, and she was a real fidget - couldn't sit still a minute. [...] Her robe, now, it was something you'd never see anywhere else. It was all made of silk malachite, that's a kind you get sometimes. It's stone but it looks like silk, you want to take and stroke it.

This tale concludes by stating: "It's a chancy thing to meet her, it brings woe for a bad man, and for a good one there's little joy".

In "The Malachite Casket" story, which constitutes a direct sequel of the "Mistress" tale above (as the exploits of Stepan passes on to his daughter Tanyushka)., the heroine Tanyushka is also black-haired and green-eyed, and eventually called a double of the Mistress. M. A. Batin surmised she must have been the daughter born between the Mistress and Stepan. (Note: Batin (1983), p. 98 apud Sozina (2004), p. 8 and Batin (1976), p. 117)

In "The Malachite Box" collection in general, the Mistress serves as a "magic helper" to the characters, and in "The Malachite Casket" in particular, the beggar woman (or "sorceress") who comes visit to instruct Tanyushka is evidently the Mistress of the Copper Mountain in disguise. The glass button which this teacher gives Tanyushka is a magic tool to give her answers when she needs, and later when the decision is pressing for the family to sell the Malachite Box, the green-eyed woman peers back at Tanyushka and nods affirmingly. This woman in the button is in fact the mistress's double (двойник), according to Elena K. Sozina.

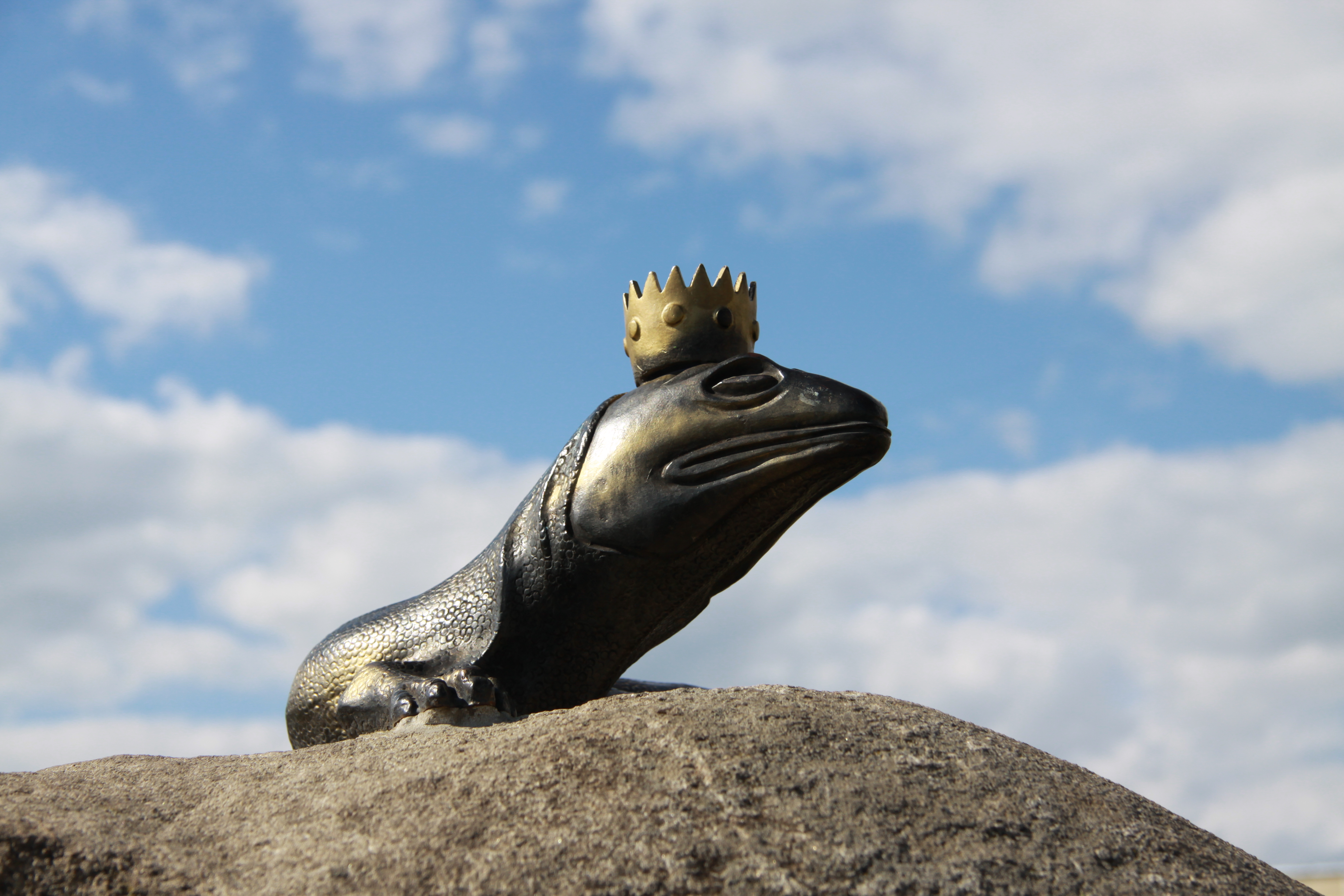
A monument in Sysert

In "The Stone Flower" it is said that the Mistress has her own "mountain craftsmen":

They're skilful craftsmen who live in the mountain, and no man ever sees them. Whatever the Mistress wants, they make it for her. I saw a bit of their work once. [...] Our serpents, no matter how good they are, they're but stone, but this was like as if it was living. A black line down the black, and eyes—ye'd think it was just going to up and sting ye. They can make anything!

In "The Manager's Boot-Soles", the cruel "manager" or prikazchik of the mine (Note: The name of the prikazchik (приказчик was: Северьян Кондратьич; Severyan Kondratych) was wary because the Mistress "didn't like it when folks [the miners] were treated ill underground". But he still resolved to mistreat his workers, and received warnings by a woman's voice that if he persisted, his boot-soles will be the only remains left to be given to his family. Then finally, she herself appeared before the prikazchik (here translated "bailiff"): (Note: "The Bailiff's Bootsoles" is the English title in Manning's translation.)

All of a sudden the bailiff saw a figure in front of him. It was moving lightly, waving a lamp. At the turn of the gallery [mine level] he saw it was a woman. [...] He started running after her, but his faithful men [henchmen] weren't in any great hurry to follow. They were all shaking. Because they saw this was bad — it was she herself. [...] The bailiff saw a maid of amazing beauty standing before him, and here brows were drawn together in a line and her eyes blazed like burning coals.

She can be reached through the stone forest. She is cruel and just, she dislikes greedy people and is indifferent toward their suffering, but she shows her benevolent side to those with talent and selflessness. Valentin Blazhes stated that in the Malachite Box she is a classical ambivalent character, because she combines good and evil, life and death, beauty and ugliness. Nataliya Shvabauer commented that her duality is represented in her every trait, from the appearance to her functions. Even her seemingly joking pranks trying to frighten people can be deadly, as in "Sochen and His Stones", where Sochen winds up dead.

== Origin and development ==
The Lizard Queen (on the right) in the old Sverdlovsk coat of arms (1973).

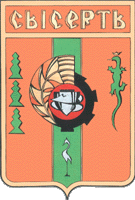
The Lizard Queen (on the right) in the old Sysert coat of arms (1982).

Pavel Bazhov had heard the tales about her at the Polevskoy Copper Smelting Plant from the miners' storyteller Vasily Alexeyevich Khmelinin (Василий Алексиевич Хмелинин), nicknamed "Grandpa Slyshko/Slishko" (дедушки Слышко) by children. "The Copper Mountain" is believed to be the Gumyoshevsky mine, the oldest mine of the Ural Mountains. It was sometimes called "The Copper Mountain" or simply "The Mountain" by the populace. Valerii Nikitich Demin commented that the Mistress is a universal mytheme, while the Copper mountain is the specific location: the Gumyoshevsky mine and Mount Azov.

The origin of the character is unclear. A concept of a mother goddess or Mother Earth was very popular in every culture, including the local Mansi and Khanty people. The Ural ethnographer A. Sagalayev suggested that the character originated from the goddesses Umay and Kaltes-Ekwa. He noted that the Mansi-Khanti mother goddess could shrink to the size of a rock and a sculpture or expands to the size of a mountain. The Mistress might have appeared as a successor of Azovka, because she was most famous in the same areas as Azovka before her, so the keeper of treasures slowly turned into their master. Bazhov believed that the most ancient creature of the Ural mythology was in fact Azovka, the Great Serpent appeared next, and the last one was the Mistress of the Copper Mountain. Just like Azovka, the Malachite Maid attracts single men. Mark Lipovetsky commented her black hair colour hints at her non-Slavic parentage, possibly from the "Old People", like Azovka. Dark-haired and mysterious, she does not look like typical Russian girls. Bazhov is quoted as saying that since miners (prospectors) did not see women for long stretches of time, their tales will always feature women in a guy-girl (i.e., sexual) context, and their versions of the Mistress of the Copper Mountain reflected that, but that he went in a different direction. That is to say, Bazhov (rather than sexual) sought aesthetic and socialistic motivations to the unfolding of these stories, according to Denis Zherdev.

He also thought that the Mistress outgrew her initial function of a treasure keeper. She became "the embodiment of power, wealth and beauty" which revealed itself only before the best of people. E. V. Kulikova theorized that her place in the Ural mythology is most likely connected with the perception of the mountains as "magical space". The mountain was the source of life, the protector from hostile forces and the residence of divine patrons.

Alexei Ivanov suggested that the Mistress most likely originates from a spirit of place as a "stone dryad". There is also a hypothesis that she represents the Roman goddess Venus, as local copper from the Polevskoy Copper Smelting Plant was branded with the Venus symbol (♀) for tens of years in the 18th century. V. Bezrukova theorizes that the Mistress of the Copper Mountain symbolizes the "relationship" between people and the mountain riches, and that she in fact protects Christian virtues, e.g. she prevents greed, encourages kindness, modesty, honor and skill (Christian virtues). However Alexei Ivanov argues that she reveals her "genetic relationship" with pagan gods, and her ethics is not Christian. In one of the stories, she is displeased her malachite is used for pillars in a Christian church, and causes the yield of riches of the "Gumeshky" mine to wane significantly.

Maya Nikulina points at her relation to the realm of the dead, as she does not ear or drink, does not leave any traces, her clothing is made of stone and so on, and the Mountain connects her to the world of the living. The character might be of Finno-Ugric origin. The Finno-Ugric peoples, who lived in that area, later migrated to the Baltic Sea or assimilated into the new Russian culture. Their folklore featured the underground riches, moral and spiritual powers, personified in Chthonic deities, mining and metallurgic techniques unknown to Russians.

The Mistress's attributes—lizards, copper and malachite—are not Christian. Nataliya Shvabauer, noting that in her namesake tale she appeared lizard-bodied but still with a maiden's head, characterized this hybrid form as "filth", (Note: погани.) something by definition both supernatural (unchristian) and "foul. (Note: нечистое.) The images of lizards and snakes were found on the Permian bronze casts (the 5-15 centuries) around Mount Azov. Copper was a symbol of female beauty at the Urals. Malachite symbolized youth, hope, misfortune and grief at the same time. The craftsmen who worked with malachite often died of tuberculosis, affected by the poisonous malachite dust. The gemcutters produced malachite jewellery for sale only, but never wore it themselves. Keeping it in the house was a bad omen.

== Critical analysis ==
The Mistress became a popular character in the Soviet Union. Folklorists of the former Ural State University, who collected tales near Sysert after Pavel Bazhov's death, noted they "have not met a single person who did not hear about the Mistress", but they mostly knew about her from Bazhov's skazy and referred to them: "Read some Bazhov, he wrote it down". Few story-tellers heard of her from oral tradition.

During Soviet times critics commonly described this character as the protector of the working class from the oppressors, from the standpoint of proletarian literature. However, Nikulina disagrees: the Mistress is neither rescuer nor protector. Rather than defending workers, she tests them. Social justice is of no concern to her: "the landlord is punished for being greedy and stupid", not for being the landlord.

Lipovetsky commented that she is the most terrifying characters of the collection, a beautiful girl and a dangerous demonic creature at the same time, exhibiting both features of sexuality and death: thus she represents the struggle and unity between Eros and Thanatos, characterized by three major Freudian motives—the sexual drive, the death drive (her realm is the realm of the dead) and the castration anxiety (loss of power). The latter is shown when she persistently and spitefully provokes the local administration, forcing the protagonists ("The Mistress of the Copper Mountain", "The Two Lizards") to relay offensive messages. Zherdev pointed out that the Mistress's female domain is the world of chaos, destruction or spontaneous uncontrolled acts of creation. Colliding with the ordered factory world, such power brings in randomness, variability, unpredictability and capriciousness. Direct contact with it is a violation of world order, and does not end well. Natalia V. Budur's entry in The Fairy Tale Encyclopedia (in Russian) suggests that the Mistress represents conflict between human kind and nature. She compares the character with Mephistopheles, because a human needs to wager his soul with her in order to get the ultimate knowledge, however, the Mistress does not force anyone to abandon their moral values, and therefore "is not painted in dark colours". As a specific example, the Mephistophelian (Faustian) bargain the Mistress brings to Danilo/Danila occurs as a theme in "The Stone Flower". Lyudmila I. Skorino believed that she represented the nature of the Urals, which inspires a creative person with its beauty.

== In popular culture ==
The character Queen of the Copper Mountain appeared in Mercedes Lackey's 2007 novel Fortune's Fool. She also appears as the title character in Mercedes Lackey’s 2020 novel Jolene which is set in the coal mines of rural Tennessee.

Shimun Vrochek authored a story called The Master of the Copper Mountain (Хозяин Медной горы, Hozjain Mednoj gory), in which he mentioned the character. It was published in his Serzhantu Nikto Ne Zvonit collection in 2006.

Vladimir Makanin wrote the Mistress parody characters in some of his stories, such as the mother of the disfigured Kolka (Колька) in his 1976 short story "Voices" (Голоса, Golosa).

== See also ==
- Karzełek
- Shubin (ghost)
- The Fire-Fairy

== Bibliography ==
- Bazhov, Pavel (1952). "Ural'skiye skazy" Уральские сказы [Ural tales]. In Bazhova, Valentina A.; Surkov, Alexey A. [in Russian]; Permyak, Evgeny Andreevich [in Russian] (eds.). Sobranie sochinenij v trekh tomakh Собрание сочинений в трех томах [Works. In Three Volumes] (in Russian). Vol. 1. Annotated by Lyudmila I. Skorino. Moscow: Khudozhestvennaya Literatura.
  - Bazhov, Pavel (1952b). Bazhova, Valentina A.; Surkov, Alexey A. [in Russian]; Permyak, Evgeny Andreevich [in Russian] (eds.). Sochineniya: Malakhitovaya shkatulka Сочинения: Малахитовая шкатулка [Works: Malachite Box] (in Russian). Vol. 2. Annotated by Lyudmila I. Skorino. Moscow: Gosudarstvennoye izdatel'stvo khudozhestvennoy literatury.
  - Part IV, ≈ (1952b) pp. 288–
  - Part V, ≈ (1952b) pp. 300–
  - Part VI, ≈ (1952b) pp. 307–
  - "Объяснение отдельных слов, понятий и выражений, встречающихся в сказах" [Explanation of individual words, concepts and expressions found in tales], ≈ (1952b) pp. 315–336
- Bazhov, Pavel Petrovich (1944). The Malachite Casket: tales from the Urals. Library of selected Soviet literature. Translated by Alan Moray Williams. Hutchinson & Co. ltd. pp. 22, 25. ISBN 9787250005603.
- Bazhov, Pavel (1950s). Malachite Casket: Tales from the Urals. Translated by Eve Manning. Moscow: Foreign Languages Publishing House. pdf@archive.org; fulltext@issu.com (restricted access)
- Blazhes, Valentin V. (1982). Bazhov i rabochiy fol'klor Бажов и рабочий фольклор [Bazhov and workers' folklore] (PDF) (in Russian). Sverdlovsk: Ural State University.
- Blazhes, Valentin V. (1983). "Rabochiye predaniya rodiny P. P. Bazhov" Рабочие предания родины П. П. Бажова [Workers' Legends of the Motherland P. P. Bazhov]. Bytovanie folklora v sovremennosti, na materiale jekspedicij 60-80 godov Бытование фольклора в современности, на материале экспедиций 60-80 годов [The existence of folklore nowadays, based on the material of the 60-80s expeditions] (PDF). Фольклор Урала (in Russian). Vol. 7. Sverdlovsk: Ural State University. pp. 5–22.
- Blazhes, Valentin V., ed. (28–29 January 2004). P. P. Bazhov i socialisticheskij realizm // Tvorchestvo P.P. Bazhova v menjajushhemsja mire П. П. Бажов и социалистический реализм // Творчество П. П. Бажова в меняющемся мире [Pavel Bazhov and socialist realism // The works of Pavel Bazhov in the changing world]. The materials of the inter-university research conference devoted to the 125th birthday (in Russian). Yekaterinburg: Ural State University. Archived from the original on 2015-12-22. snippet @ books.google.com
  - Sozina, E. K. [in Russian] (2004). "O nekotorykh motivakh russkoy klassicheskoy literatury v skazakh P. P. Bazhova o «Masterakh»" О некоторых мотивах русской классической литературы в сказах П. П. Бажова о «Мастерах» [On Some Motifs of Russian Classical Literature in P. P. Bazhov's Tales of the «Masters»]. In Blazhes, Valentin V. (ed.). P. P. Bazhov i socialisticheskij realizm // Tvorchestvo P.P. Bazhova v menjajushhemsja mire П. П. Бажов и социалистический реализм // Творчество П. П. Бажова в меняющемся мире [Pavel Bazhov and socialist realism // The works of Pavel Bazhov in the changing world] (in Russian). Yekaterinburg: Ural State University. pp. 6–11. Archived from the original on 2015-12-22.
- Gelhardt, R.R. [in Russian] (1961). Fantasticheskiye obrazy gornyatskikh skazok i legend Фантастические образы горняцких сказок и легенд [Fantastic images of miners' tales and legends]. Materials and research of the USSR Academy of Sciences 6. Russkiy fol'klor. pp. 166–249.
- Lipovetsky, Mark (2014). "Zloveshcheye v skazakh Bazhova" Зловещее в сказах Бажова [The Uncanny in Bazhov's Tales]. Quaestio Rossica (in Russian and English). 2 (2): 212–230. doi:10.15826/qr.2014.2.051. hdl:10995/27732. ISSN 2311-911X.
- Meshcherova, K.; Gerasimova, A. (20 June 2014). "Legendy i mify Urala glazami khudozhnikov" Легенды и мифы Урала глазами художников [Legends and Myths of the Urals by the Eyes of the Artists] (PDF). Materials Collection of the 5th International Scientific Conference (in Russian) (Nauchnye diskussii o tsennostjah sovremennogo obshhestva [Научные дискуссии о ценностях современного общества], lit. "Scientific discussions about our society's values").
- Nikulina, Maya P. [in Russian] (2000). "Pro starinnoye zhit'ye i pro taynuyu silu" Про старинное житье и про тайную силу [About ancient life and about secret power]. Ural Урал (in Russian) (6).
- Nikulina, Maya P. [in Russian] (2003). "Pro zemelnye dela i pro tajnuju silu. O dalnikh istokakh uralskoj mifologii P.P. Bazhova" Про земельные дела и про тайную силу. О дальних истоках уральской мифологии П.П. Бажова [Of land and the secret force. The distant sources of P.P. Bazhov's Ural mythology]. Filologichesky Klass (in Russian). 9.
- Sagalaev, A. M. [in Russian] (1991). Uralo-altayskaya mifologiya: simvol i arkhetip Урало-алтайская мифология: символ и архетип [Ural-Altaic mythology: symbol and archetype]. Novosibirsk: Nauka.
- Shvabauer, Nataliya (10 January 2009). Tipologija fantasticheskih personazhej v folklore gornorabochih Zapadnoj Evropy i Rossii Типология фантастических персонажей в фольклоре горнорабочих Западной Европы и России [The Typology of the Fantastic Characters in the Miners' Folklore of Western Europe and Russia] (PDF) (Ph. D .) (in Russian). Ural State University. Archived from the original (PDF) on 2015-11-26.
- Zherdev, Denis (2003). "Binarnost kak element pojetiki bazhovskikh skazov" Бинарность как элемент поэтики бажовских сказов [Binarity as the Poetic Element in Bazhov's Skazy] (PDF). Izvestiya of the Ural State University (in Russian) (28): 46–57.
