= Uralsky Sovremennik =

Uralsky Sovremennik (Russian: Уральский современник, lit. "contemporary Ural"), later known as simply Ural (Russian: Урал), was a literary almanac published in the Soviet Union from 1938 to 1957. The magazine was based in Sverdlovsk. It mostly published the works of the authors from the Ural region. The almanac was operated by the Sverdlovsk department of the Union of Soviet Writers.

The almanac was founded as Uralsky Sovremennik in 1938 by Klavdiya Rozhdestvenskaya, the editor-in-chief of the Sverdlovsk Publishing House. It existed under that title until 1956, with 33 volumes released. Among editors of the almanac were Klavdiya Rozhdestvenskaya herself, the famous Ural writer Pavel Bazhov, N. Popova, V. A. Starikov. Pavel Bazhov's fairy tales, such as "The Stone Flower", "The Malachite Casket", "Silver Hoof", were published in it.

During the Great Patriotic War it published the works of the evacuated writers. After some debate the Union of Soviet Writers decided to reorganize the magazine to expand the number of authors and "its circle of topics". In 1957 a new editorial board was hired, Uralsky Sovremennik was renamed to Ural. Only 4 volumes (1/34—4/37) were published under that title. It was shut down the same year.
