= Mariya Litovskaya =

Russian academic

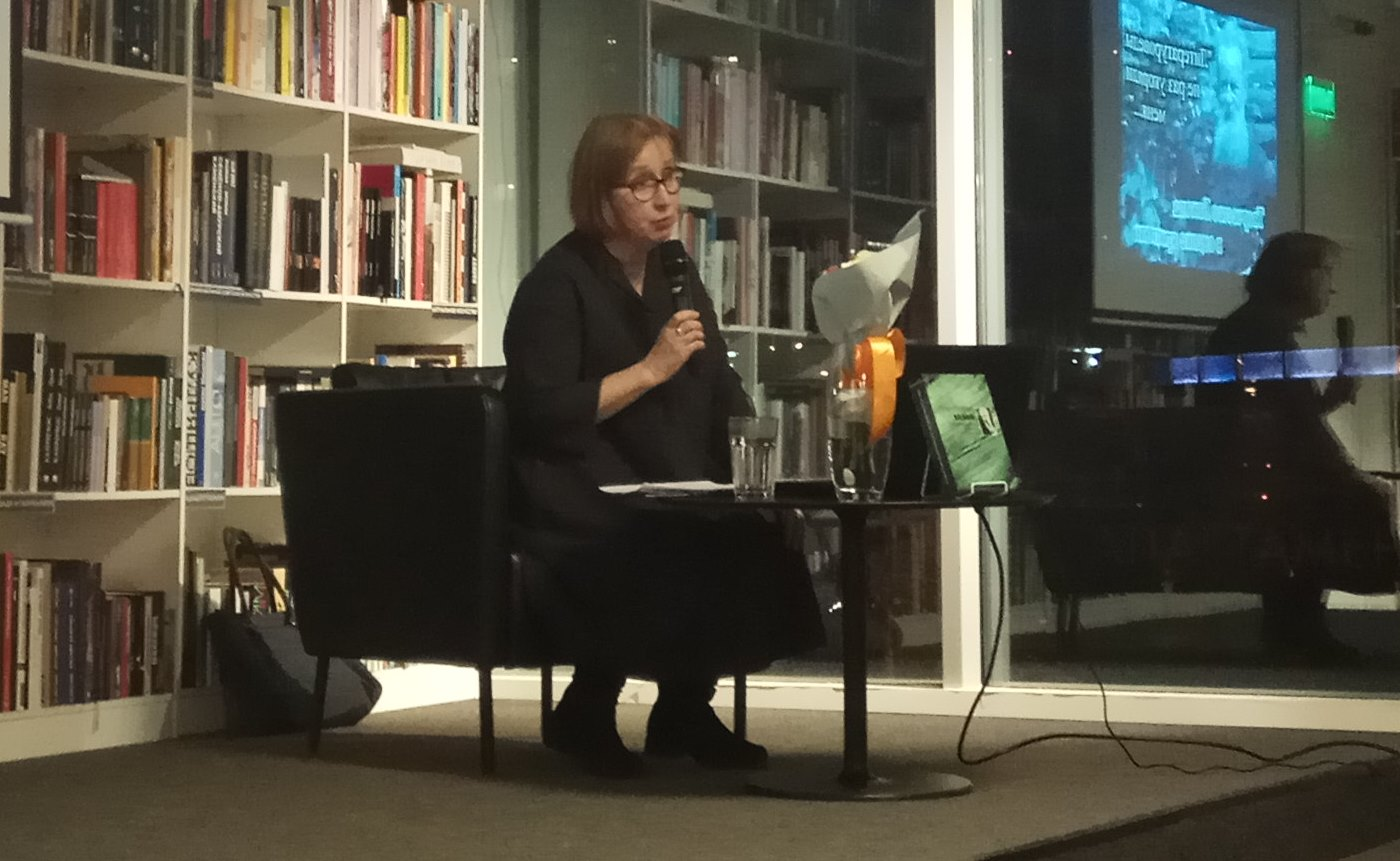
Literary critic Maria Litovskaya.

Mariya Arkadevna Litovskaya, née Yeremeyeva (Russian: Мария Аркадьевна Литовская; b. October 25, 1958) is a Soviet and Russian philologist, literary critic, Professor of the Ural Federal University, one of the leading scholars at the Institute of History and Archaeology under the Russian Academy of Sciences (Ural Department). She is a specialist in the fields of the 20th century Russian literature, sociology of literature and education, Ural literature.

== Career ==
She was born in Sverdlovsk in the teachers' family, graduated from the philological department of the Ural Federal University in 1980. In 1983 she defended her thesis. Starting from that year Litovskaya worked for the University at the Soviet Literature Department. Her doctoral dissertation Social and artistic phenomenon of Valentin Kataev (Russian: Социохудожественный феномен В. П. Катаева, romanized: Sotsiokhudozhestvennyj fenomen V. P. Kataeva) was defended in 2000. From 1998 to 2007 she headed the History Department of the Institute of History and Archaeology (the Russian Academy of Sciences, Ural Department).

== Selected publications ==
- C. De Maegd-Soëp. Yury Trifonov and the drama of Russian intelligentsia (Russian: Де Магд-Соэр К. Юрий Трифонов и драма русской интеллигенции, romanized: De Magd-Sojer K. Jurij Trifonov i drama russkoj intelligencii), 1997 (translation)
- The phoenix sings before the sun. Valentin Kataev's phenomenon (Russian: Феникс поет перед солнцем. Феномен Валентина Катаева, romanized: Feniks poet pered solncem. Fenomen Valentina Kataeva), 1999
- The gender relations and gender policy at higher education institution: a collection of articles (Russian: Гендерные отношения и гендерная политика в вузе: Сб. статей, romanized: Gendernye otnoshenija i gendernaja politika v vuze: Sb. statej), 2003
- Bazhov encyclopaedia (Russian: Бажовская энциклопедия, romanized: Bazhovskaja entsiklopedija), 2007
