= Na Smenu! =

Soviet and Russian student newspaper

Na Smenu! (Russian: На смену!) was a Soviet and Russian student newspaper published from 1921 to 2009 (with a break in the 1940s). The publication was based in Yekaterinburg.

In the 1920s Na Smenu! was associated with the local group of proletarian writers of the same name, who the newspaper editors consulted with. The publication led the extremely aggressive propaganda of atheism and communism. In 1929-1930 the writers group has been "purged from unwelcome elements". The newspaper welcomed industrialization and participated in the organization of socialist emulations.

After the Great Patriotic War (1941–1945) became the exemplary Komsomol publication. Student of journalism had their internships there. Na Smenu! published Komsomol's annual report on its achievements called Lenin's Ladder, articles on blue-collared workers, environment, humor, sports.

After the beginning of Perestroika it changed its focus to economical issues, readers' letters, philosophical articles and even criticism of the local authorities. It was later published by the local Gazprom department. It was shut down on August 28, 2009 due to the lack of financing.
