= Vladislav Kazenin =

- Владислав Казенин
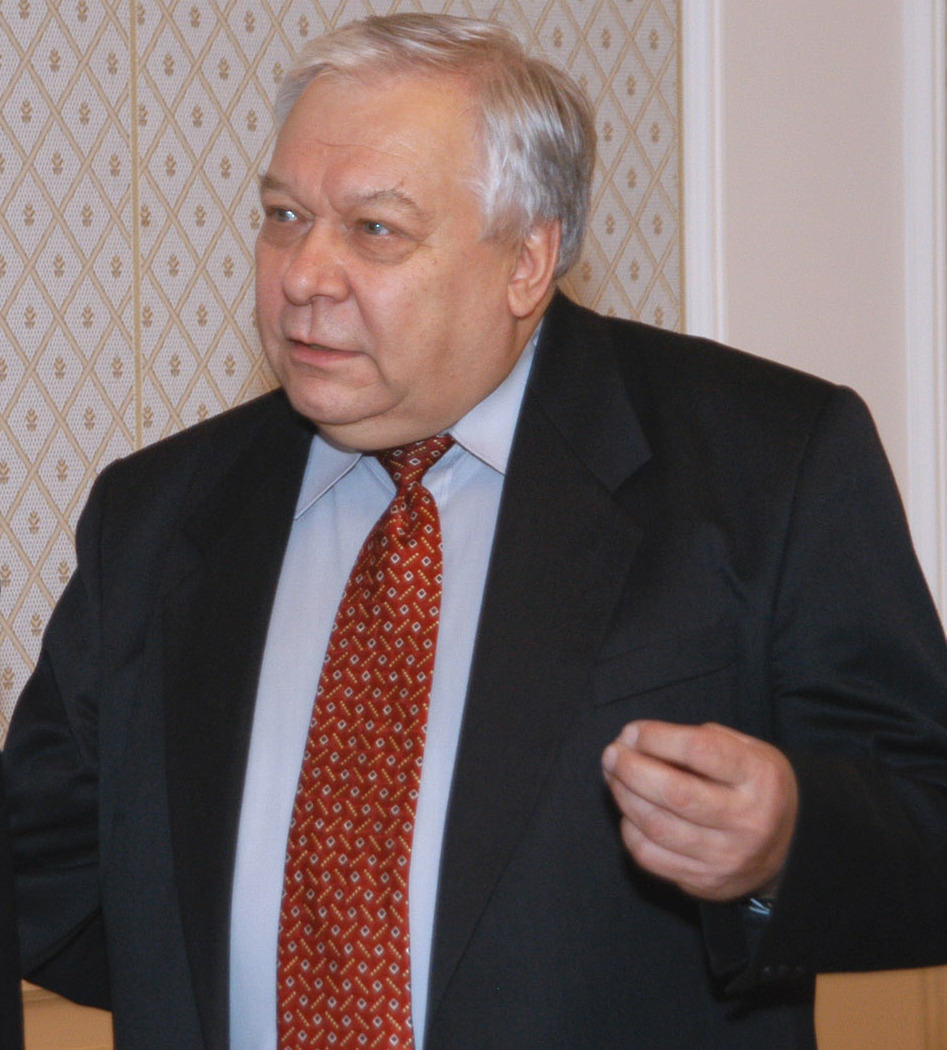
- Kazenin in 2004

Chairman of the Board of Union of Russian Composers
- In office 1990–2014
- Preceded by: Rodion Shchedrin
- Succeeded by: Rashid Kalimullich

Personal details
- Born: May 21, 1937 Kirov, Soviet Union
- Died: 17 February 2014 (aged 76) Moscow, Russia
- Resting place: Vagankovo Cemetery
- Education: Urals Mussorgsky State Conservatoire
- Occupation: Pianist
- Known for: Chairman of the Union of Russian Composers

Vladislav Igorevich Kazenin (Russian: Владислав Игоревич Казенин; May 21, 1937, Kirov – February 17, 2014, Moscow) was Soviet and Russian composer and musician. Chairman of the Union of Russian Composers (since 1990), Deputy Minister of Culture of the USSR (1987–1990), member of the Commission under the President of the Russian Federation on State Prizes of the Russian Federation in Literature and Art, member of the Board of the Ministry of Culture of Russia and the Council under the President of the Russian Federation for Culture and Art (1996–2001). People's Artist of the Russian Federation (1996), laureate of the State Prize of Russia (2003), Honorary Citizen of the city of Kirov (2009).

== Biography ==
He was born on May 21, 1937 in Kirov in the family of musician Igor Vikentyevich Kazenin. His father worked as the director of the Kirov Children's Music School and the Kirov College of Music. He gave his son his first piano lessons. His mother, Valentina Nikolaevna, worked as a track service engineer on the railroad. During the Great Patriotic War, creative evenings were often held in the Kazenin house with the participation of cultural and art figures evacuated to Kirov. Among them were Emil Gilels, Lev Oborin, David Oistrakh, Leonid Utesov and Klavdiya Shulzhenko. Communication with famous people largely predetermined the fate of Vladislav. He entered the children's music school and in 1943 he performed in front of the public for the first time, performing the piano concerto in D major by J. Haydn accompanied by a symphony orchestra. In 1947, Igor Kazenin was transferred to the position of director of the Sverdlovsk Musical Comedy Theater and the family moved to Sverdlovsk.

Here Vladislav entered the music school at the Urals Mussorgsky State Conservatoire, where he studied in the piano class of Berta Marants, and also attended a composition circle. After graduating from school in 1955, he entered the conservatory, where he continued to study composition and piano. In their senior years, students organized a youth section of the Ural branch of the Union of Composers of the RSFSR, of which Kazenin was elected chairman. After graduating from the conservatory, he remained to teach theoretical subjects there, while simultaneously working at the Tchaikovsky Sverdlovsk Music College. In 1966, he was elected executive secretary of the Ural branch of the Union of Composers of the RSFSR.

In 1968 he moved to Moscow, where he worked as the editor-in-chief of the All-Union Bureau for the Propaganda of Soviet Music of the Union of Composers of the USSR. In 1971 he was elected executive secretary of the Moscow Composers' Organization, in 1973 - secretary of the Board of the Union of Composers of the RSFSR, in 1979 - deputy chairman of the Union of Composers of the RSFSR and a member of the Board of the Union of Composers of the USSR. From 1975 to 1978 he hosted the television programs "Evenings of Soviet Music" and "News of Musical Life" on the 1st and 2nd channels of the All-Union Television. Since 1986 he has worked on the board of the Soviet Culture Fund, in 1987 he was appointed Deputy Minister of Culture of the USSR, where he worked until 1990.

Since 1990 he headed the Union of Composers of Russia, worked in a number of government committees.

In 1992-1997 he was a member of the board of the Ministry of Culture and Tourism of the Russian Federation.

He lived and worked in Moscow. He was fond of painting, had a large collection of paintings by Russian artists and Dymkovo toys. He regularly visited Kirov, in 2009 he participated in the First Interregional Competition - Kazenin Festival of Piano Performing Arts for Children and Youth. For his great contribution to the cultural development of Kirov, he was awarded the title of Honorary Citizen of the city.

He died on February 17, 2014 in Moscow, at the age of 76. The farewell ceremony took place at the Moscow House of Composers. The urn with the ashes was buried at the Vagankovo Cemetery (section 12).

== Awards ==
- Honorary Badge "For Cultural Patronage of the Armed Forces of the USSR" (1975)
- Medal "For Distinguished Labour" (1976)
- Honored Artist of the RSFSR (May 26, 1980)
- Order of the Red Banner of Labour (1986)
- Medal named after A. V. Alexandrov (1988)
- People's Artist of Russia (August 30, 1996) - for great achievements in the field of art
- Order "For Merit to the Fatherland" IV degree (October 28, 2002) - for great contribution to the development of Russian musical art
- State Prize of the Russian Federation in Literature and Art in 2003 (June 12, 2004) - for the program "Academy of Music "New Itinerants"
- Order "For Merit to the Fatherland" III degree (December 17, 2007) — for his great contribution to the development of Russian musical culture, long-term fruitful social and creative activity
- Honorary Citizen of the City of Kirov (September 30, 2009) — for his great personal contribution to enhancing the authority and fame of the city of Kirov among the Russian and world musical community, fruitful activity in preserving and developing the best traditions of *Russian musical art, long-term active participation in the social and cultural life of the city of Kirov
- The 2012 Russian Federation Government Prize in Culture (December 22, 2012) — for a series of concerts for piano and orchestra — “Variations”, “Improvisations”, “Constructions”
- Order of Honour (April 12, 2013) — for great services to the development of Russian culture and art, long-term fruitful activity.
