= Sverdlovsk Film Studio =

Film studio in Yekaterinburg, Russia

Coordinates: 56°50′18″N 60°37′24″E

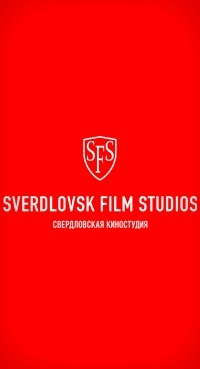

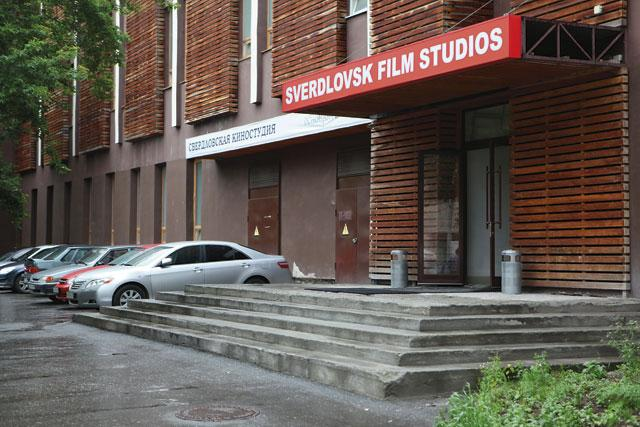
- Type: Corporation
- Industry: Motion pictures
- Founded: February 4, 1943
- Headquarters: Ekaterinburg, Russia
- Products: Motion pictures Television programs
- Website: http://stranamedia.com/

Sverdlovsk Film Studio (Russian: Свердловская Киностудия) is a Russian film studio based in Yekaterinburg (formerly Sverdlovsk). It is a regional studio that was established on 9 February 1943 in the midst of World War II. In 1944 the studio produced its first film, Silva, a musical comedy based on the Austrian operetta Sylva.

In 1998, Sverdlovsk Film Studio almost went bankrupt. This was resolved with help from the state, a new management team and independent producers.

== Directors ==
- 1943-1944 — Shitov Aleksandr Sergeyevich
- 1944-1946 — Novitskiy G. V.
- 1946-1948 — Blioh Yakov Moiseyevich
- 1948-1950 — Mordokhovich Mikhail Leontyevich
- Turgeneva Galina Mikhailovna
- Shumilin A. Y.
- 1956-1959 — Pyastolov V.A.
- …
- 1975-1988 — Aslovskiy Yuriy Aleksandovich
- 1988-1990 — Plotnikov Baleriy Pavlovich
- 1990-1993 — Alekseyev Gennadiy Mikhailovich
- …
- 1994-2003 — Negahev Georgiy Aleksandovich
- 2003-2021 — Churbanov Mikhail Aleksandovich
- 2021-recent — Shadrin Victor Arkadyevich

== Feature films ==
- 2020. Beginning (2020 Начало) – 2012
- Zoloto (Золото) – 2012
- Varvara 3D (Варвара 3D) – 2012
- Vlyublen y bezoruzhen (Влюблен и безоружен) – 2010
- Istoria lyubvi ili novogodniy rozigrish (История любви или новогодний розыгрыш)
- The Golden Snake (Золотой полоз) – 2007
- K vam prishel Angel (К вам пришел Ангел) – 2005
- Pervye na Lune (Первые на Луне) – 2005
- Privet, malysh! (Привет, малыш!) – 2001
- Suka (Сука) – 2001
- Iz otgjloskov dlyekoi rechi (Из отголосков далёкой речи) – 1996
- Sysknot byuro "Felix" (Сыскное бюро «Феликс») – 1993
- Makrov (Макаров) – 1993
- Predchuvstvie (Предчувствие) – 1991
- Pered rassvetom (Перед рассветом) – 1989
- Gruz "300" (Груз «300») – 1989
- Ohota na yedinoroga (Охота на единорога) – 1989
- 55 gradusov nizhe nulya (55 градусов ниже нуля) – 1986
- Jeleznoe pole (Железное поле) – 1986
- Taina zolotoi gory (Тайна золотой горы) – 1985
- Zyerna vechnogo kolosa (Зёрна вечного колоса) – 1985
- Demidovy (Демидовы) – 1983
- Semyen Dejnev (Семен Дежнев) – 1983
- Zdes tvoi front (Здесь твой фронт) – 1983
- Putishestvie budit priyatnym (Путешествие будет приятным) – 1982
- I ne konchaetcya doroga (И не кончается дорога) – 1981
- Dym otechestva (Дым отечества) – 1980
- Bezymyannaya zvezda (Безымянная звезда) – 1979
- Privalovskit milliony (Приваловские миллионы) – 1972
- Ugryum-reka (Угрюм-река) – 1969
- Trembita (Трембита) – 1968
- Igra bez pravil (Игра без правил) – 1965
- Schestnadtsataya vesna (Шестнадцатая весна) – 1963
- Kogda kazaki plachut (Когда казаки плачут) – 1963
- Vanya (Ваня) – 1958

== Animated features ==
- The Pink Doll (Розовая кукла) – 1997
- Dobro pjalovat (Добро пожаловать) – 1986
- Kutx i myshy (Кутх и мыши) – 1985

== Film festivals organized with the support of the Sverdlovsk Film Studio ==
- 2013-2018 — Kinohackathon: Russian Forum of Cinema and Creative Economy
- 2015-2018 — A man of work: Russian Film and Internet Projects Festival
- 2015 — Rusalfest: Film Festival in industrial cities

== Awards ==
Gratitude of the Minister of Culture of the Russian Federation (August 28, 2003) — for fruitful work and in connection with the 60th anniversary.
