= Skaz =

Russian oral form of narrative

Skaz (Russian: сказ, IPA: [ˈskas]) is a Russian oral form of narrative. The word comes from skazátʹ, "to tell", and is also related to such words as rasskaz, "short story" and skazka, "fairy tale". The speech makes use of dialect and slang in order to take on the persona of a particular character. The peculiar speech, however, is integrated into the surrounding narrative, and not presented in quotation marks. Skaz is not only a literary device, but is also used as an element in Russian monologue comedy.

Skaz was first described by the Russian formalist Boris Eikhenbaum in the late 1910s. In a couple of articles published at the time, Eikhenbaum described the phenomenon as a form of unmediated or improvisational speech. He applied it specifically to Nikolai Gogol's short story The Overcoat, in a 1919 essay titled How Gogol's "Overcoat" Is Made. Eikhenbaum saw skaz as central to Russian culture, and believed that a national literature could not develop without a strong attachment to oral traditions. Among the literary critics who elaborated on this theory in the 1920s were Yury Tynyanov, Viktor Vinogradov, and Mikhail Bakhtin. The latter insists on the importance of skaz in stylization, and distinguishes between skaz as a simple form of objectified discourse (as found in Turgenev or Leskov), and double-voiced skaz, where an author's parodistic intention is evident (as found in Gogol or Dostoevsky).

In the nineteenth century, the style was most prominently used by Nikolai Leskov and Pavel Melnikov, in addition to Gogol. Twentieth-century practitioners include Mikhail Bulgakov, Aleksey Remizov, Mikhail Zoshchenko, Andrei Platonov, and Isaac Babel. The term is also used to describe elements in the literature of other countries; in recent times it has been popularised by the British author and literary critic David Lodge. John Mullan, a professor of English at University College London, finds examples of skaz in J. D. Salinger's The Catcher in the Rye and DBC Pierre's Vernon God Little.

== See also ==
- The Malachite Box compiled by Pavel Bazhov, is a collection of stories with the titular genre of "Skaz"
- Gawęda, Polish oral tradition
- Saga
