= Exhibition of Achievements of National Economy =

Exhibition park in Moscow

VDNKh ВДНХ
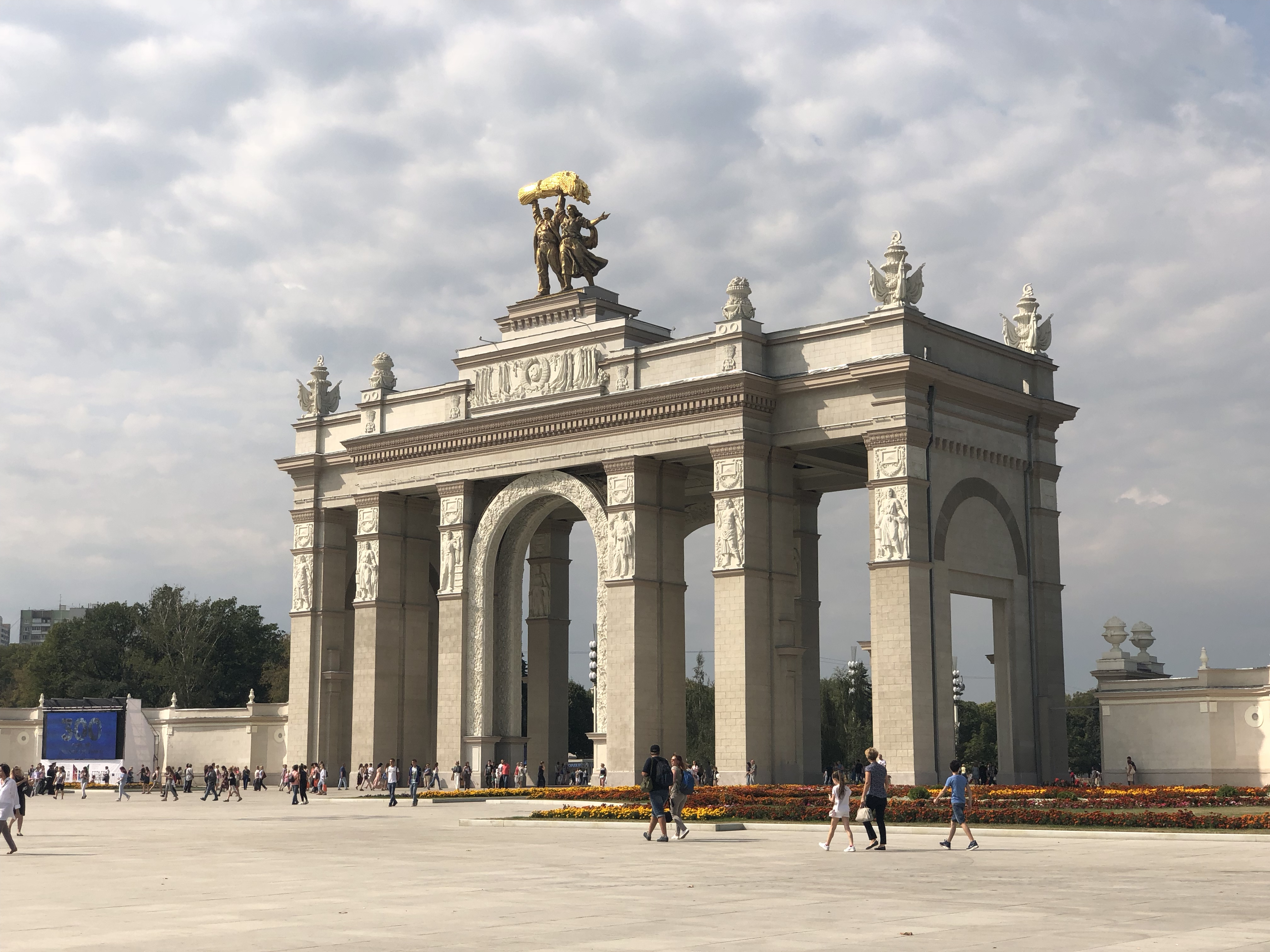
- The main entrance to VDNKh
- Interactive map of VDNKh; ВДНХ
- Former names: All-Union Agricultural Exhibition (VSKhV)
- Location: Moscow, Russia
- Coordinates: 55°49′47″N 37°37′56″E

Construction
- Opened: 17 February 1935

Website
- vdnh.ru

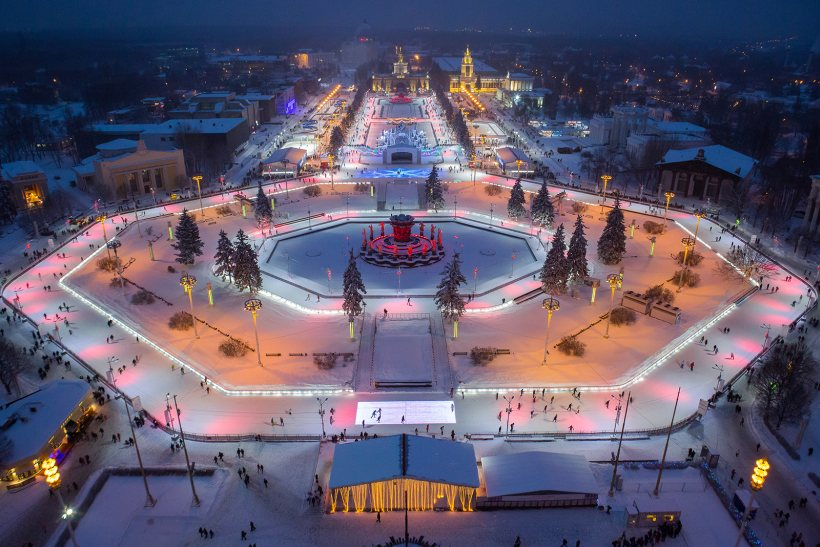
Ice rink in VDNKh

Exhibition of Achievements of National Economy (Russian: Выставка достижений народного хозяйства, Vystavka dostizheniy narodnogo khozyaystva, abbreviated as VDNKh or VDNH, Russian: ВДНХ, pronounced [vɛ dɛ ɛn xa]) is a permanent general purpose trade show and amusement park in Moscow, Russia. Between 1991 and 2014, it was also called the All-Russia Exhibition Centre (Russian: Всероссийский выставочный центр, romanized: Vserossiyskiy vystavochnyy tsentr). It is a state joint-stock company.

== Location and transportation ==
VDNKh is located in Ostankinsky District of Moscow, less than a kilometer from Ostankino Tower. It is served by VDNKh subway station, as well as by Moscow Monorail. Cosmonauts Alley and the Worker and Kolkhoz Woman statue are situated just outside the main entrance to VDNKh. It also borders Moscow Botanical Garden and a smaller Ostankino Park, and in recent years the three parks served as a united park complex.

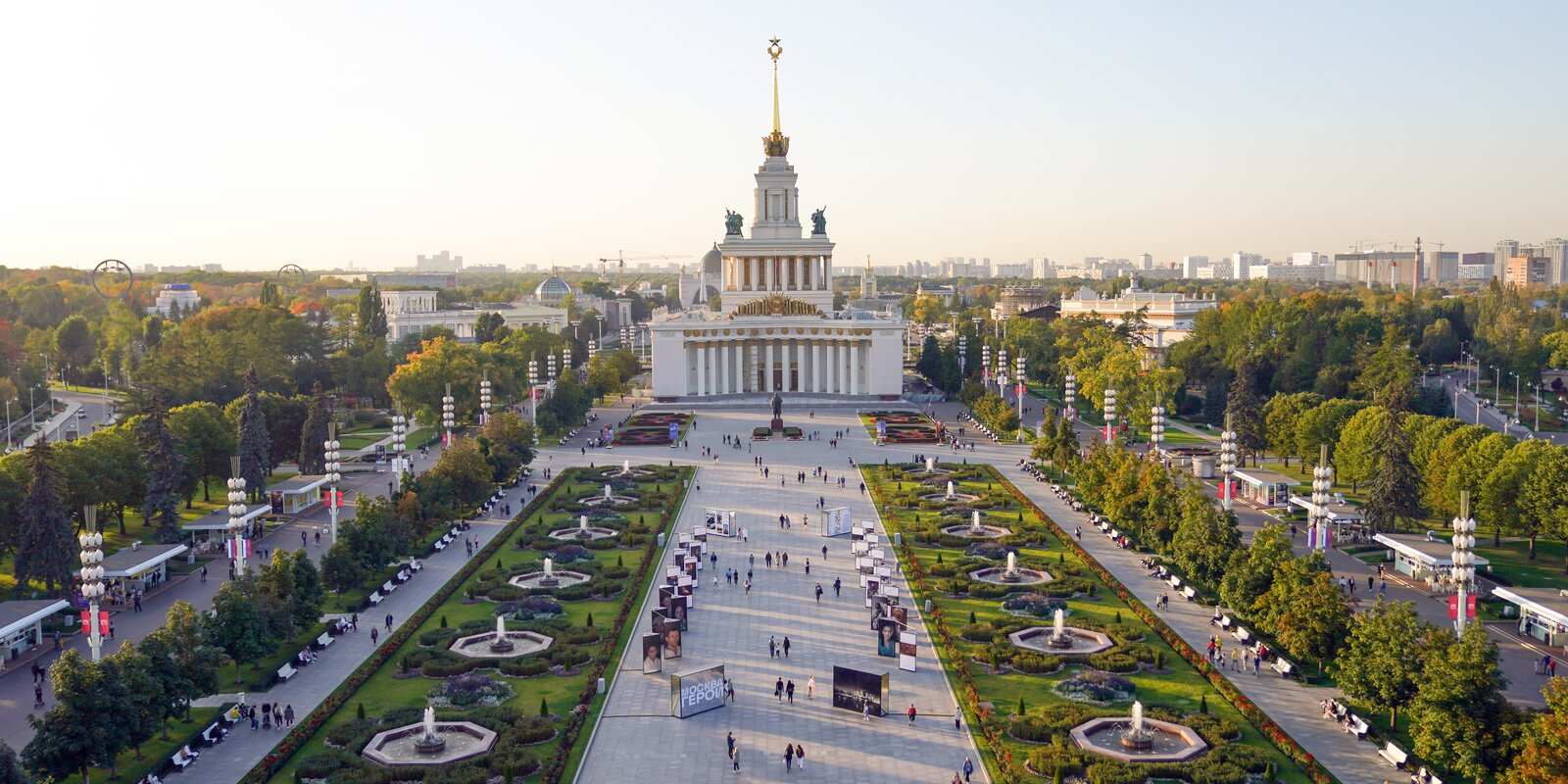
The central square

== History ==
=== 1935–1939 construction ===
The exhibition was established on February 17, 1935 as the All-Union Agricultural Exhibition (VSKhV) (Russian: Всесоюзная сельско-хозяйственная выставка; Vsesoyuznaya selsko-khozyaystvennaya vystavka). An existing site (then known as Ostankino Park, a country territory recently incorporated into the city limits), was approved in August 1935. The master plan by Vyacheslav Oltarzhevsky was approved in April 1936, and the first show season was announced to begin in July 1937 and was designed as a "City of Exhibitions" with streets and public spaces, which was very common in the 1930s. However, plans did not materialise, and three weeks before the deadline Joseph Stalin personally postponed the exhibition by one year (to August 1938). It seemed that this time everything would be ready on time, but again the builders failed to complete their work, and regional authorities failed to select and deliver proper exhibits. Some pavilions and the 1937 entrance gates by Oltarzhevsky were torn down to be replaced with more appropriate structures (most pavilions were criticised for having no windows). According to Oltarzhevsky's original plan, all of the pavilions were to be constructed from wood. In 1938, a government commission examined the construction and decided that it did not suit the ideological direction of the moment. The exhibition was considered too modest and too temporary. Oltarzhevsky was arrested, together with the Commissar for Agriculture and his staff, and eventually released in 1943. Later, he worked on the 1947-1953 Moscow skyscraper project.

As a result, in August 1938 Nikita Khrushchev, addressing the assembled Supreme Soviet of the Soviet Union, declared that the site was not ready, and the opening was postponed until August 1939. It finally opened on 1 August 1939, and was open to the public until 25 October. The 1940 and 1941 seasons followed, but following German invasion in 1941 the exhibition had to be closed until the end of World War II.

1939 pavilions, as presented in 1950 album and today:

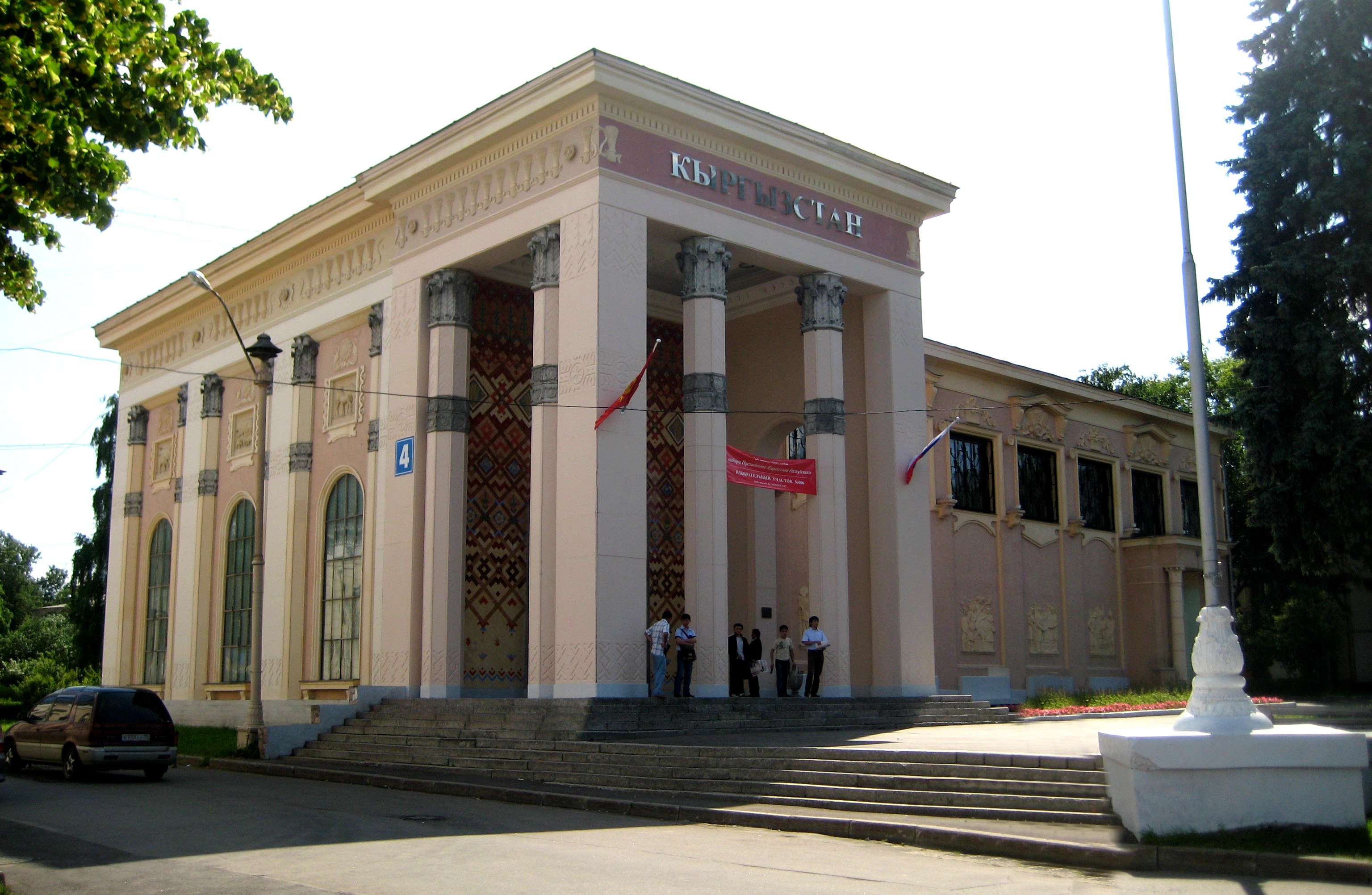
Pavilion of Kyrgyzstan

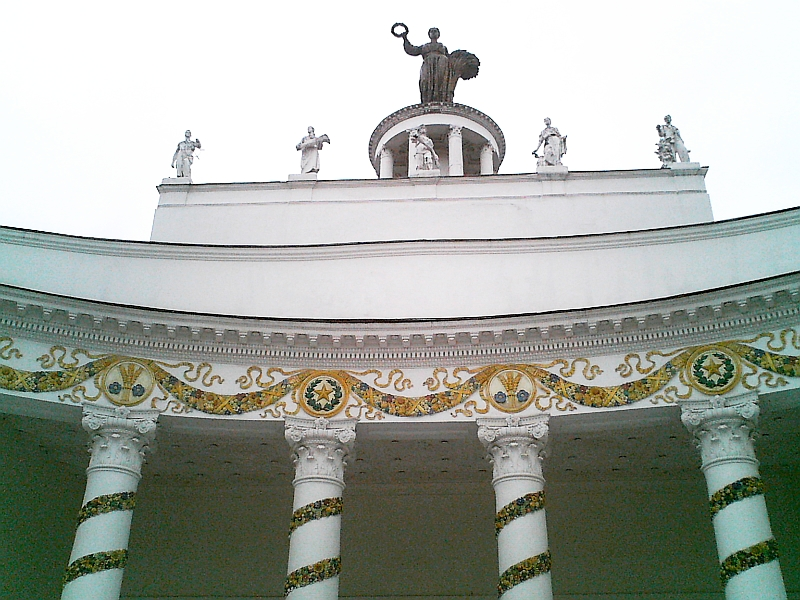
Pavilion of Belarus

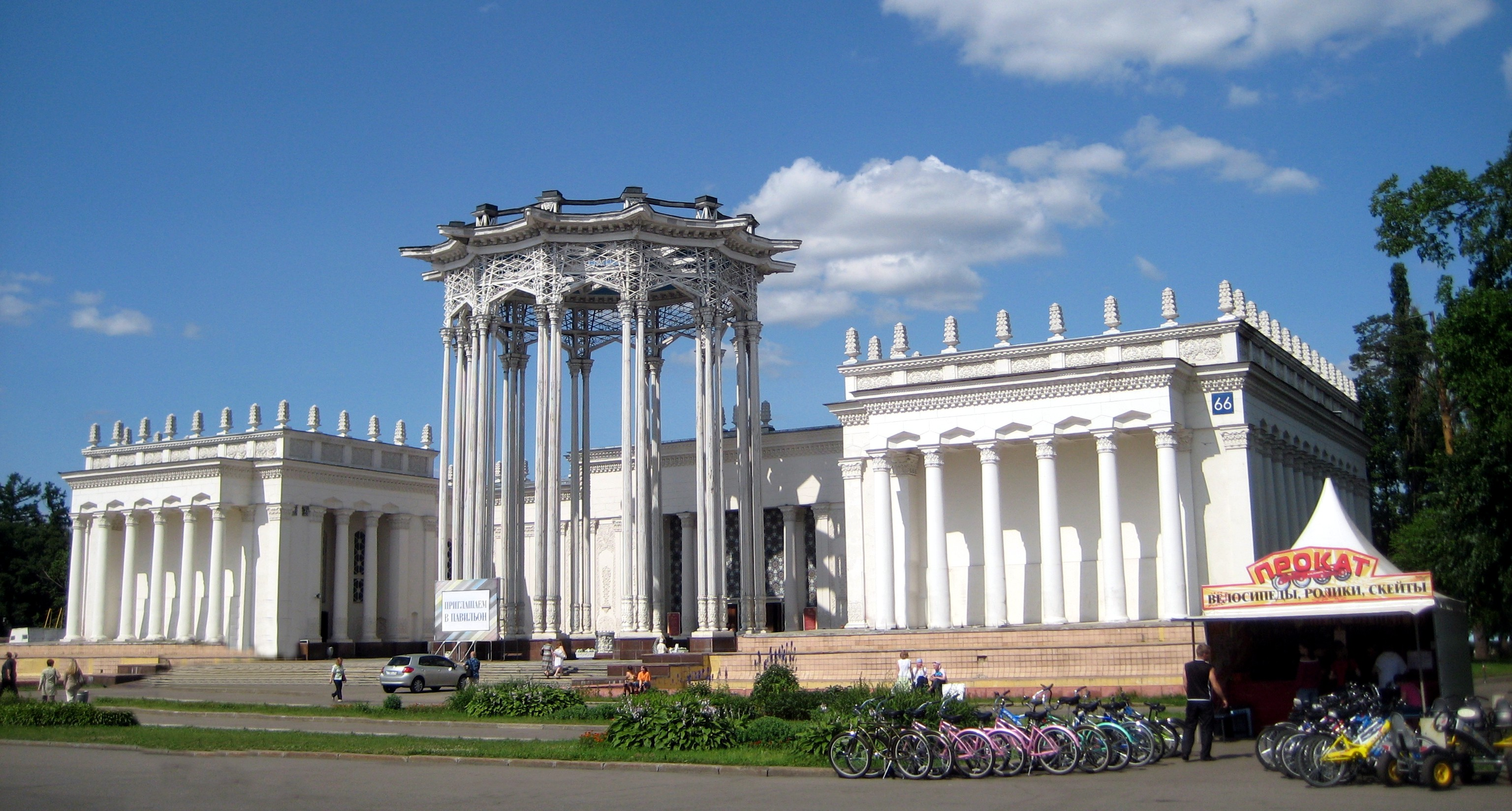
Pavilion of Uzbekistan

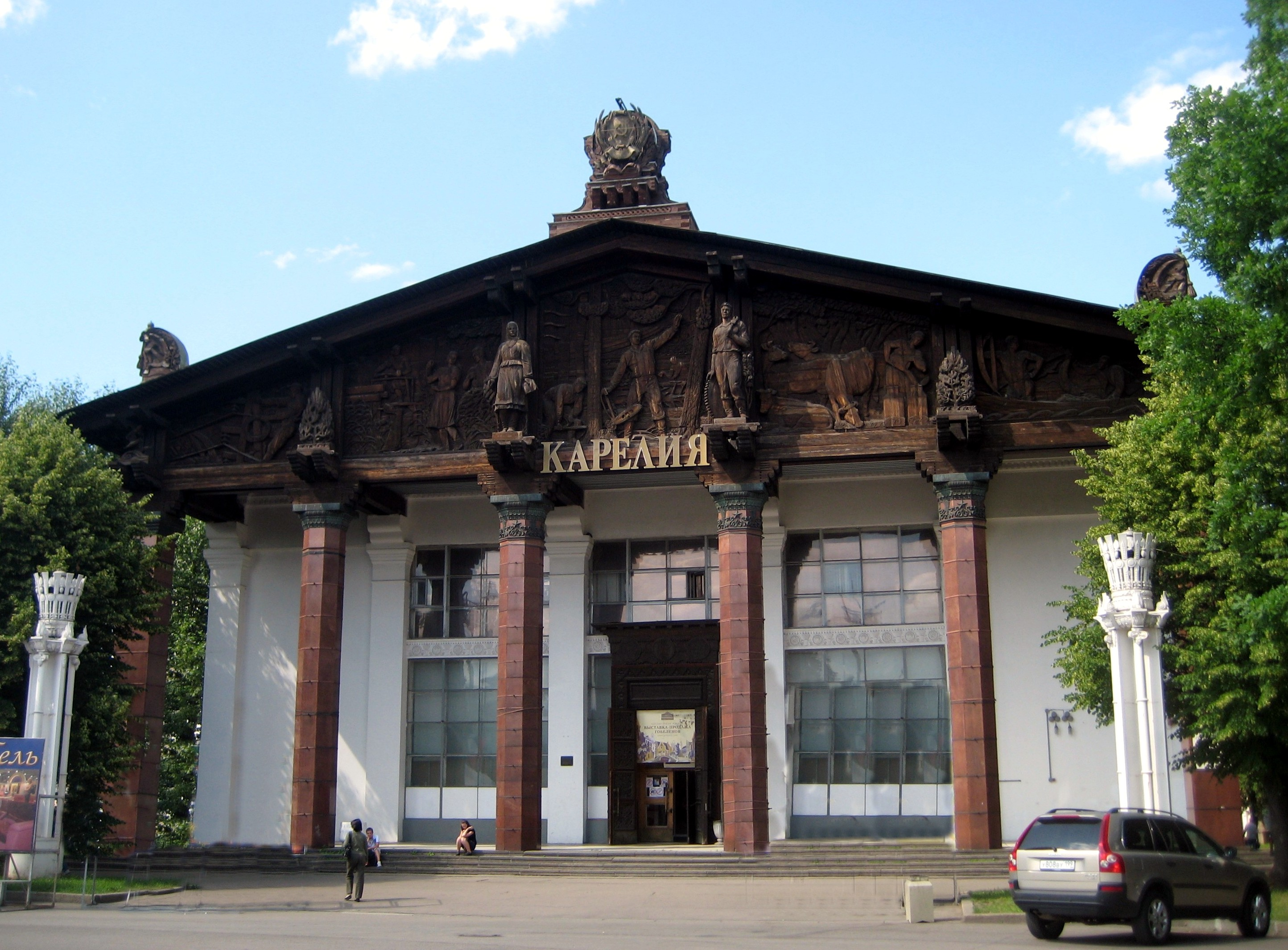
Pavilion of Karelia

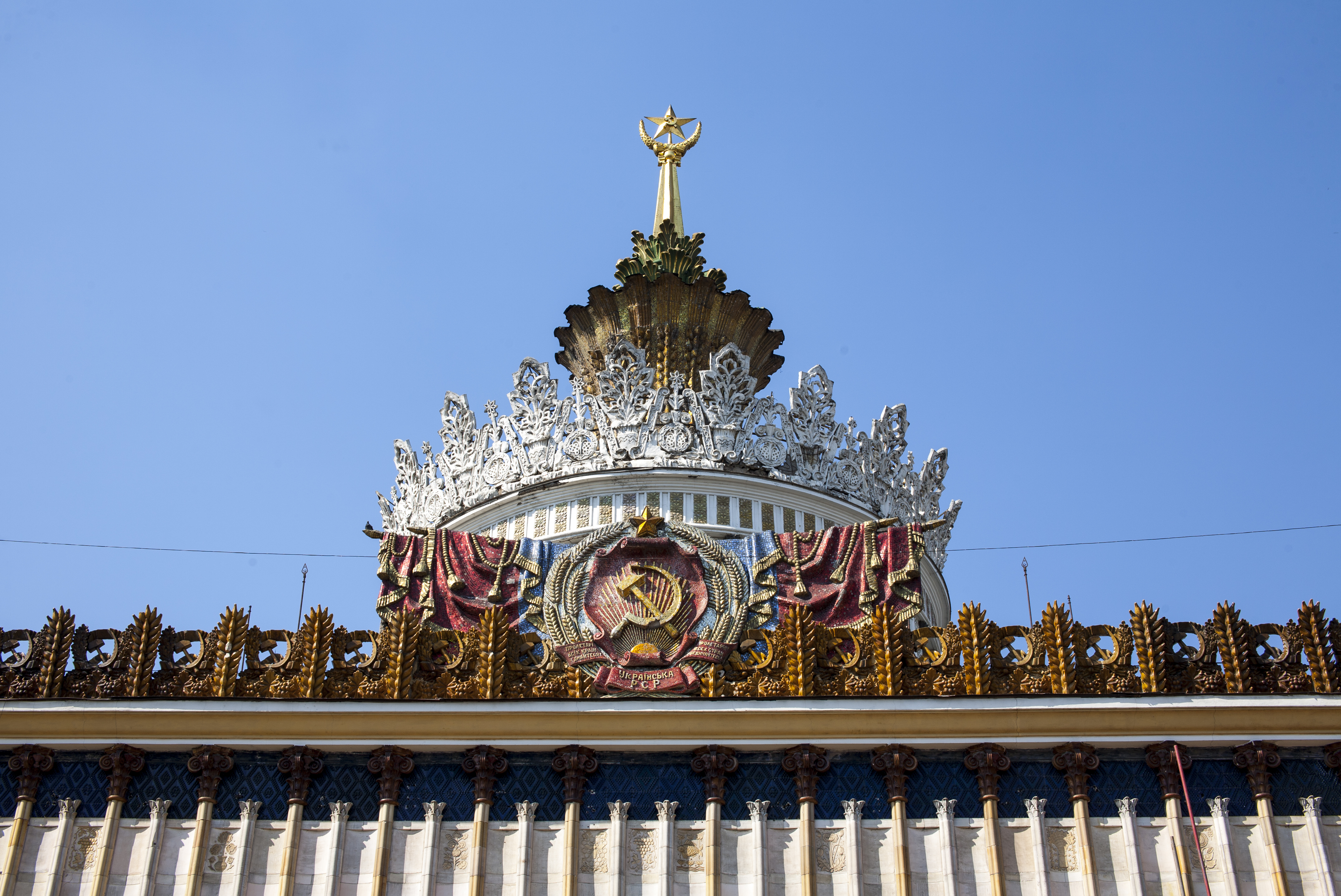
Pavilion of Ukraine

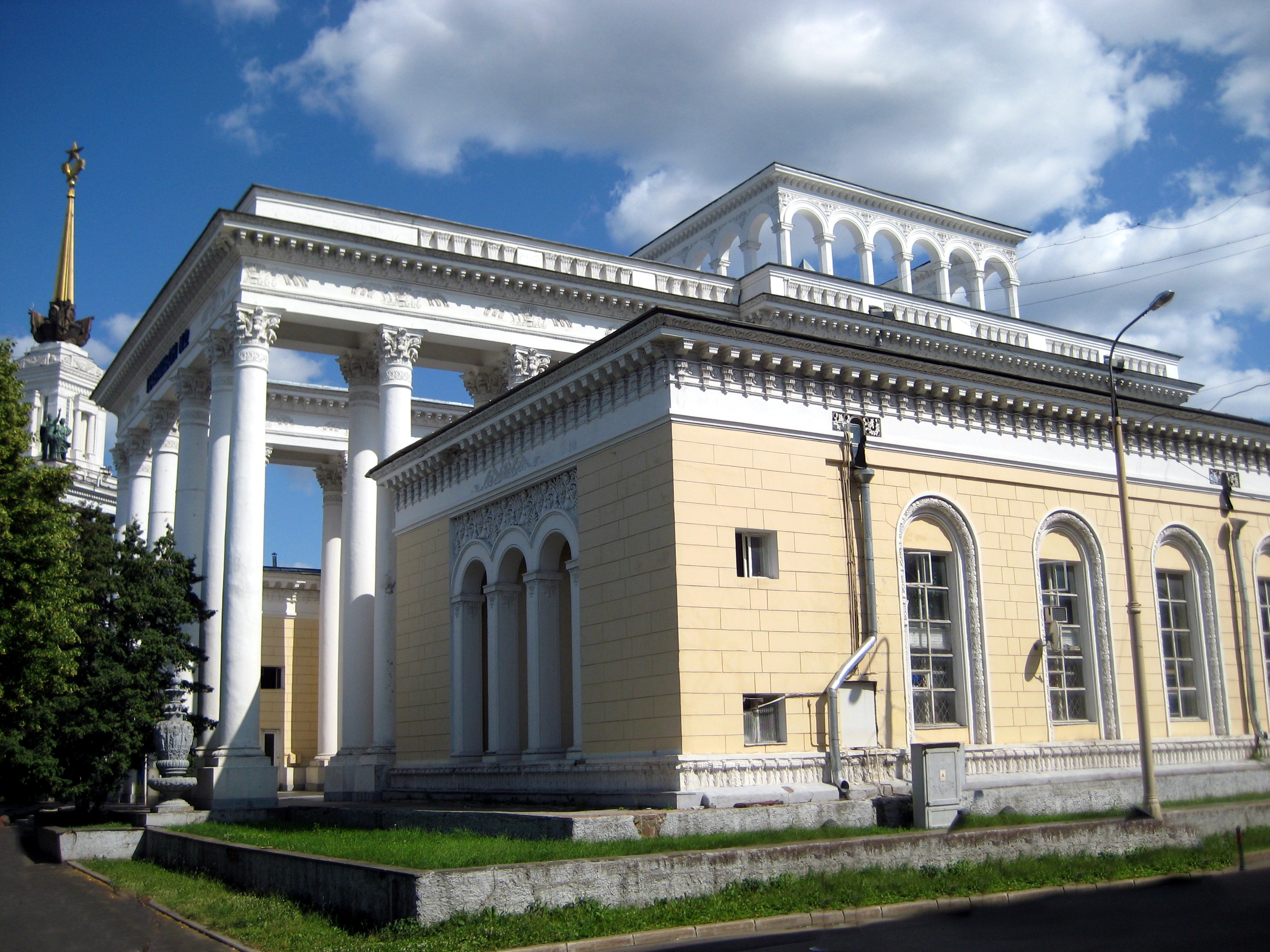
Pavilion of North Caucasus

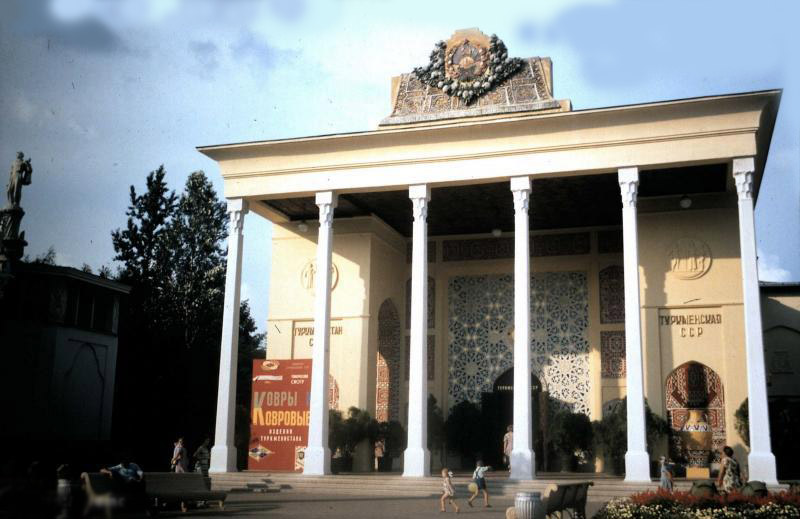
Pavilion of Turkmenistan

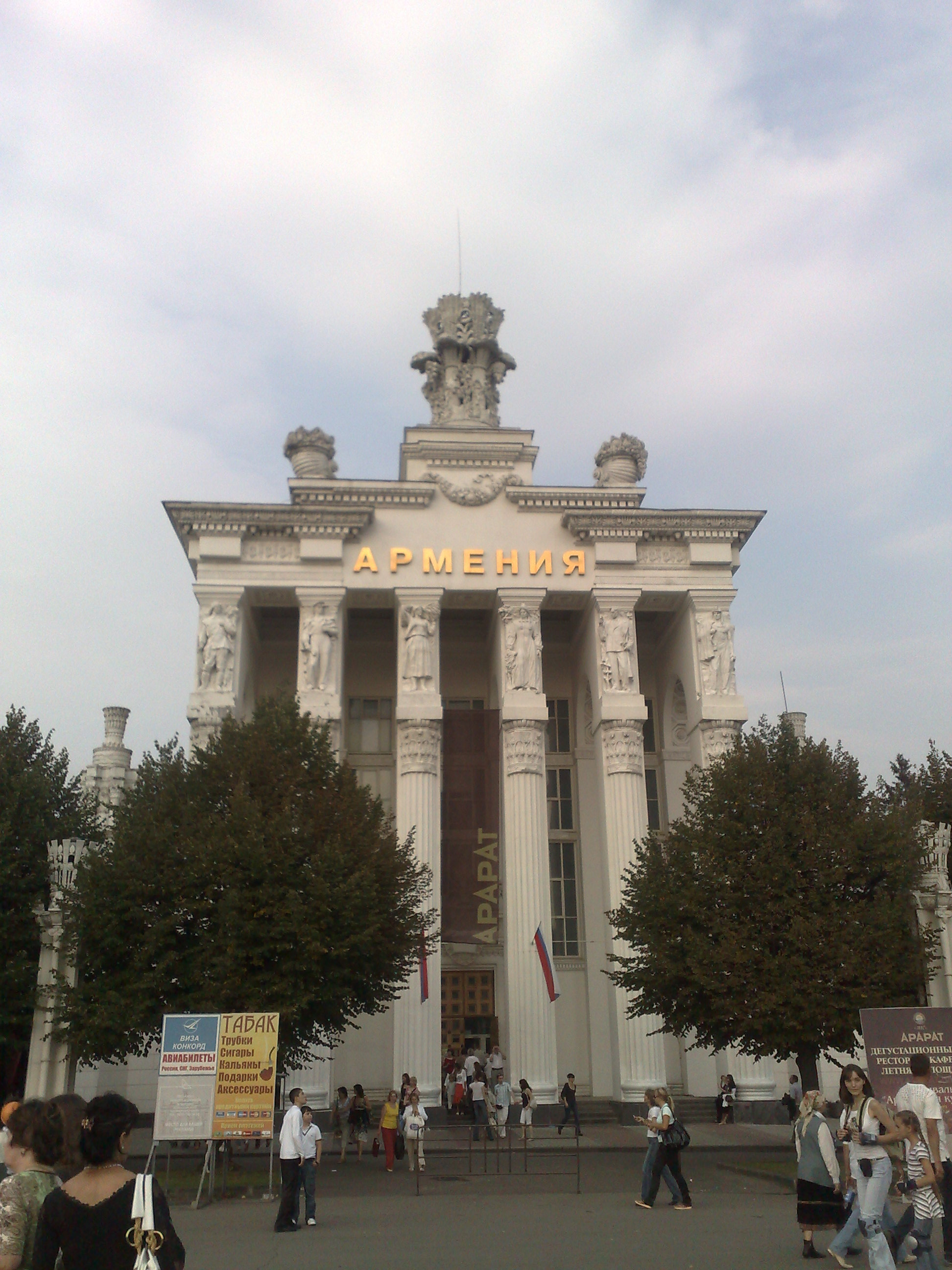
Pavilion of Armenia

Exhibitors were typically kolkhoz workers. Excursionists attended via vouchers issued by exhibition; there were distributed to workers as a reward. Independet visitors consisted of Moscow residents and transit travelers passing through the city.

=== 1948–1959 renovation ===
In October 1948, the State ordered the renewal of the Exhibition, starting with the 1950 season. Again, the opening was postponed more than once; the first post-war season opened in 1954 (still as Agricultural exhibition). In the 1956 season, the planners set aside an Industrial area within the main territory; more restructuring and rebuilding followed. In 1959 the park was renamed Exhibition of Achievements of the National Economy (Russian: Выставка достижений народного хозяйства, Vystavka dostizheniy narodnovo khozyaystva) or ВДНХ/VDNKh.

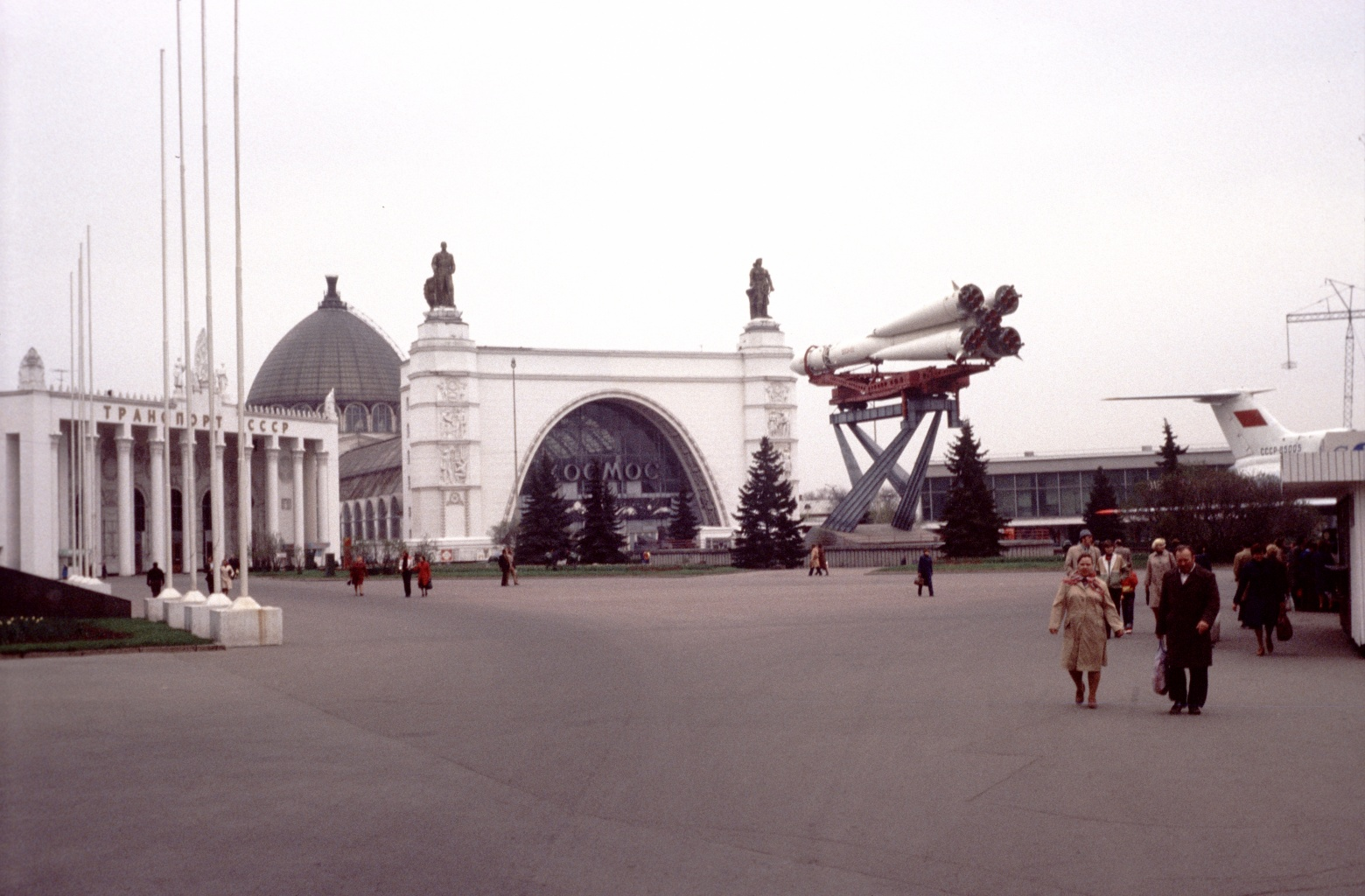
Space pavilion, 1980

By 1989 the exhibition had 82 pavilions with an exhibition area of 700,000 square metres. Each pavilion (including the 1939 "regions") had been dedicated to a particular industry or field: the Engineering Pavilion (1954), the Space Pavilion (1966), the Central Industrial Zones Pavilion (1955), the Atomic Energy Pavilion (1954), the People's Education Pavilion (1954), the Radioelectronics Pavilion (1958), the Soviet Culture Pavilion (1964).

During Soviet times, each year VDNKh hosted more than 300 national and international exhibitions and many conferences, seminars and meetings of scientists and industry professionals. The most memorable feature of the exhibition site was the Worker and Kolkhoz Woman (Rabochiy i kolkhoznitsa) statue, featuring the gigantic figures of a man and woman holding together the "hammer and sickle" (symbol of Communism). The sculpture, which reaches 25 meters toward the sky, was designed by Vera Mukhina and originally crowned the 35-meter-tall Soviet pavilion at the Paris Exposition Internationale des Arts et Techniques dans la Vie Moderne (1937).

=== Present day ===
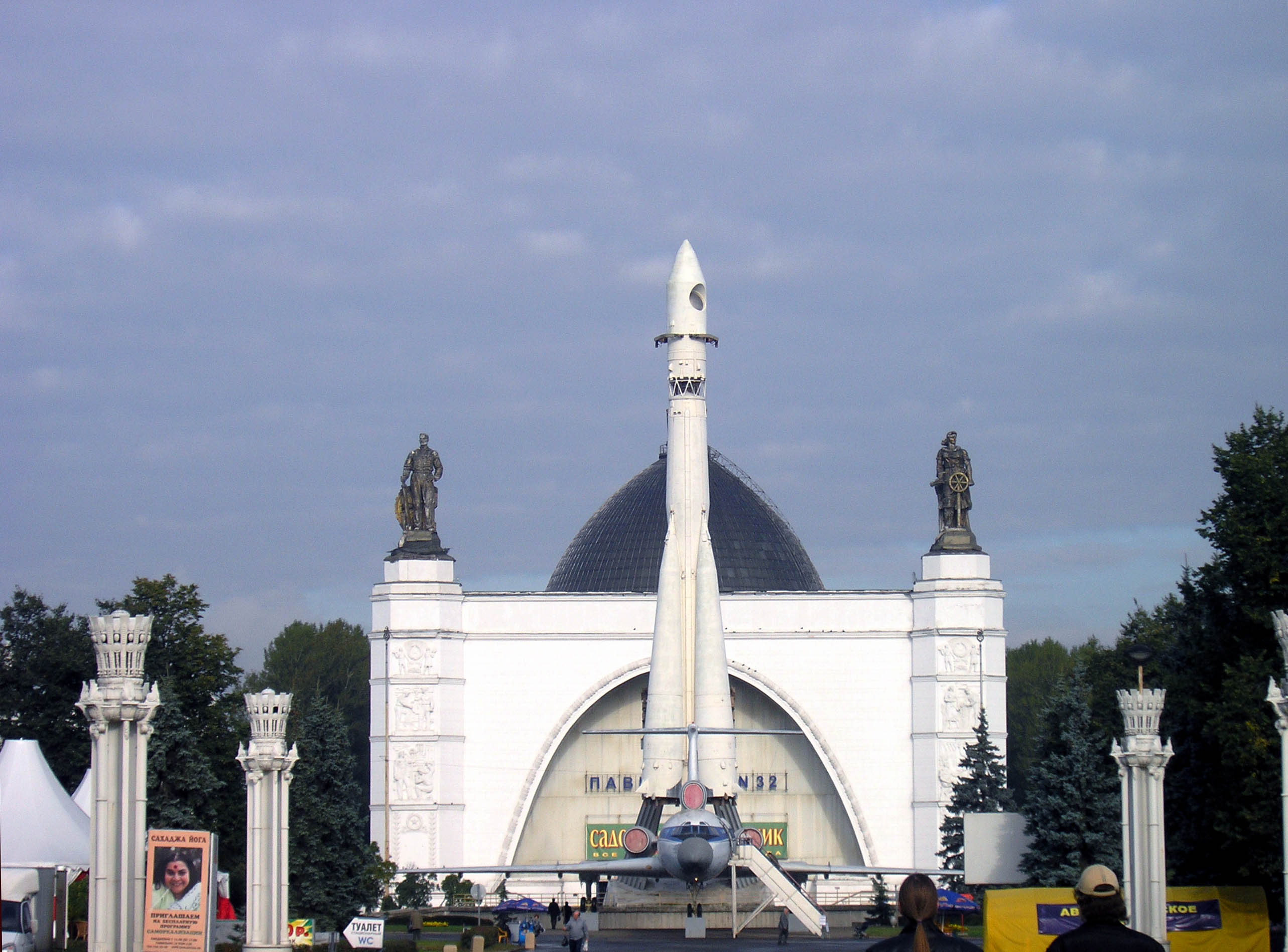
Space Pavilion with Vostok (rocket). The Tupolev Tu-154 (reg. no. SSSR-85005, prod. no. 70M005, 1970 year of production, Model 005) in front of the pavilion was dismantled on September 14, 2008. This Tupolev Tu-154 was used as a flight testbed.

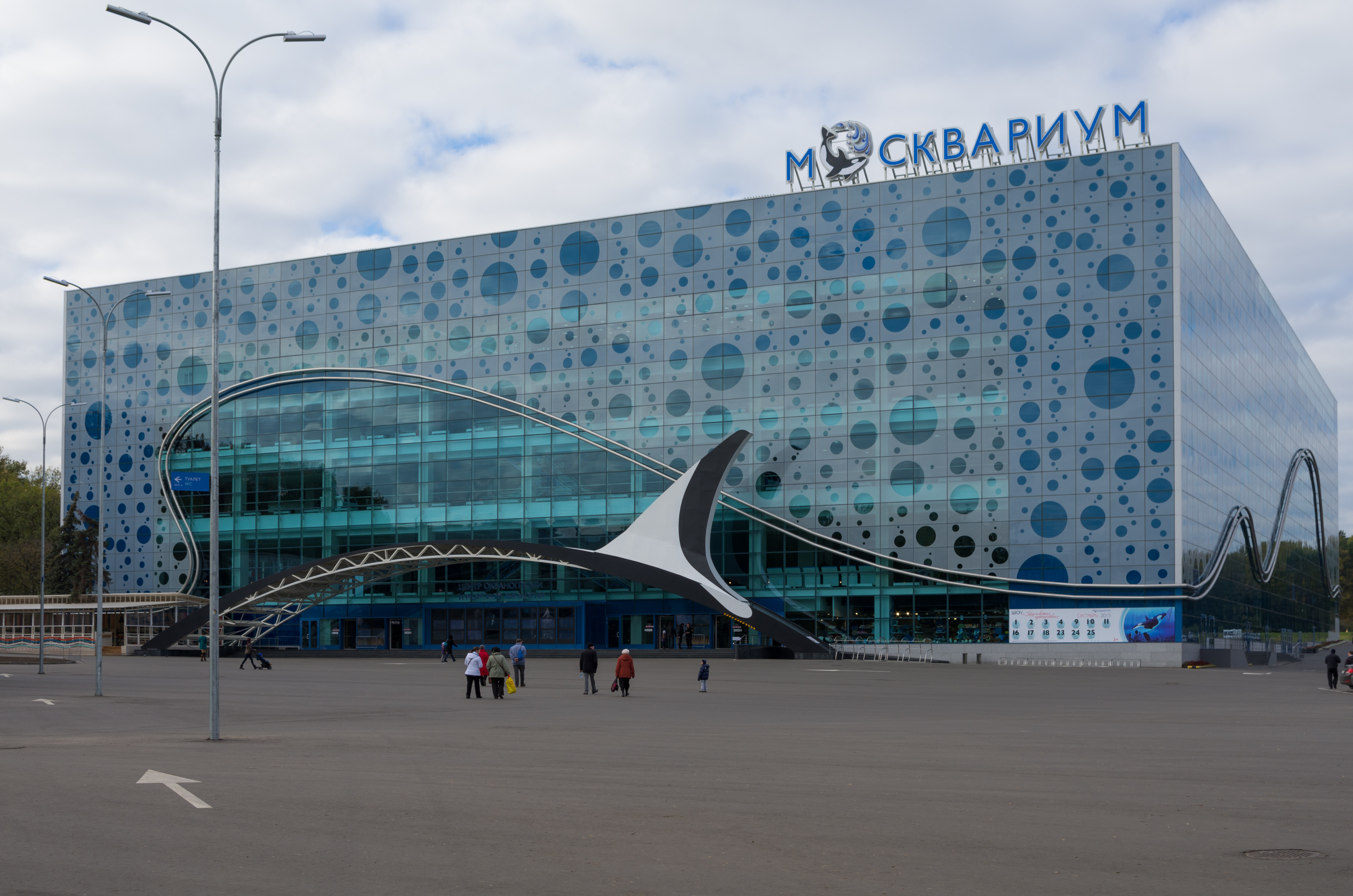
The Center for Oceanography and Marine Biology Moskvarium Aquarium

In 1992, VDNKh was renamed, receiving the new acronym VVC, which remained in use until 2014. It occupies 2,375,000 square metres of which 266,000 square metres are used for indoor exhibits. The territory of VDNKh is greater than that of the Principality of Monaco and has approximately 400 buildings. Inadequate maintenance of Vera Mukhina's statue caused such disrepair that the statue was disassembled. It was slated to be refurbished and installed on the top of the new pavilion by 2008, but funding shortages lead to dragged-out restoration. It was finally reerected in 2009, now standing atop of a large constructivist pavilion, apparently recreating the original exhibition pavilion from the 1937 World's Fair in Paris that it was designed for.

The "VDNKh" (or VVTs) complex still operates including the name of a nearby subway station and some sights. During winter, VDNKh converts into a main Skating Rink.

==== Restoration ====
On 14 May 2014 the previous name VDNKh was restored, following an interactive poll. In addition, the mayor of Moscow announced that the Russian space shuttle, the structural test article - TVA, which was an attraction and restaurant at Gorky Park in Moscow was to be moved to the VNDKh, to be displayed near the Vostok rocket in front of the Cosmos hall. It was moved 5–6 July 2014 and re-assembled by 21 July.

In September 2018, Sergey Shogurov was appointed as CEO of VDNK. New museum and exhibition spaces were opened, a Landscape Park was created, and objects of cultural heritage were carried out, public electric transport was launched. In 2019, the restoration of the "Fraternity of peoples" and "Stone Flower" fountains was completed.

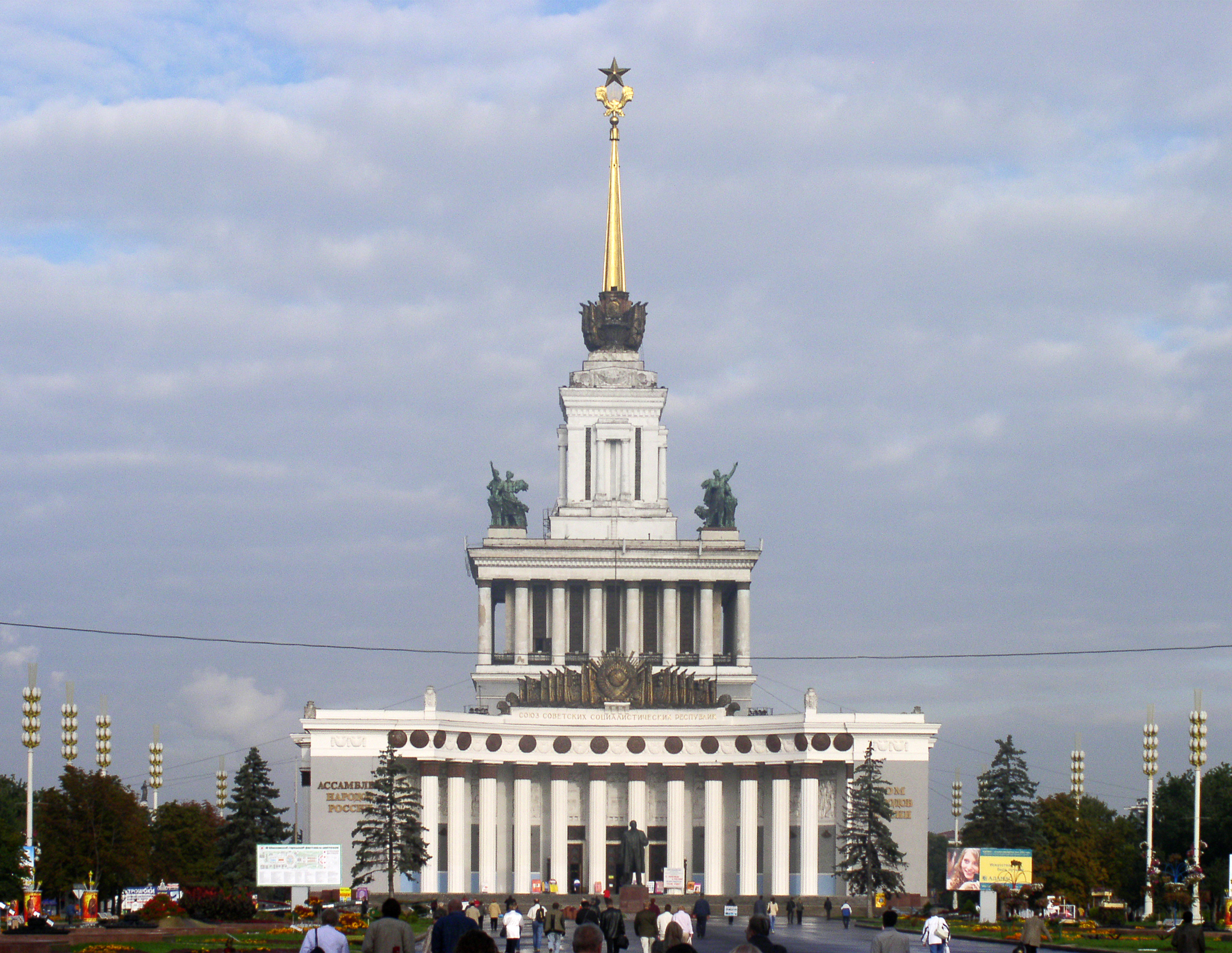
Central Pavilion

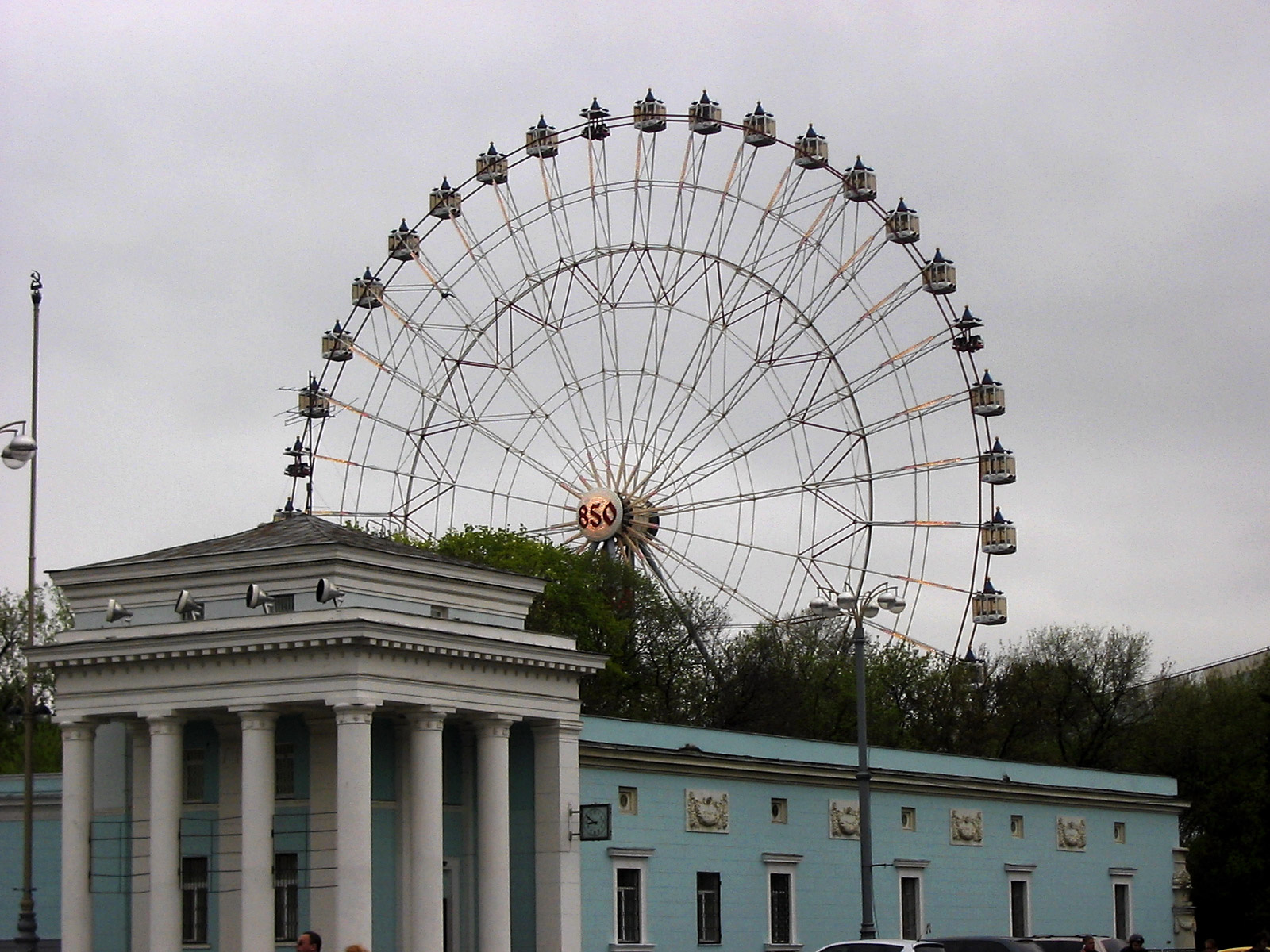
Moscow-850 Ferris wheel

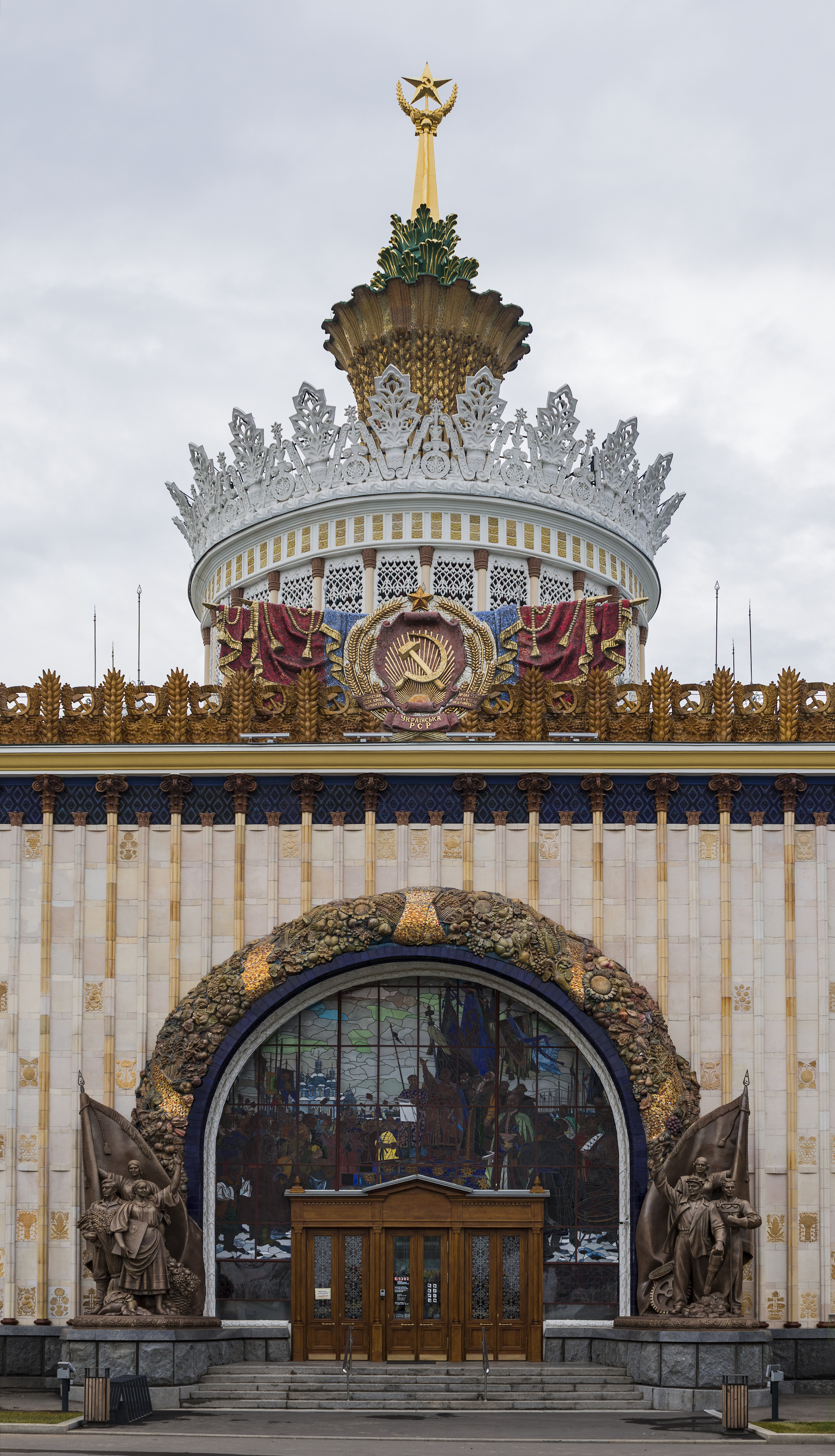
Pavilion "Agriculture"

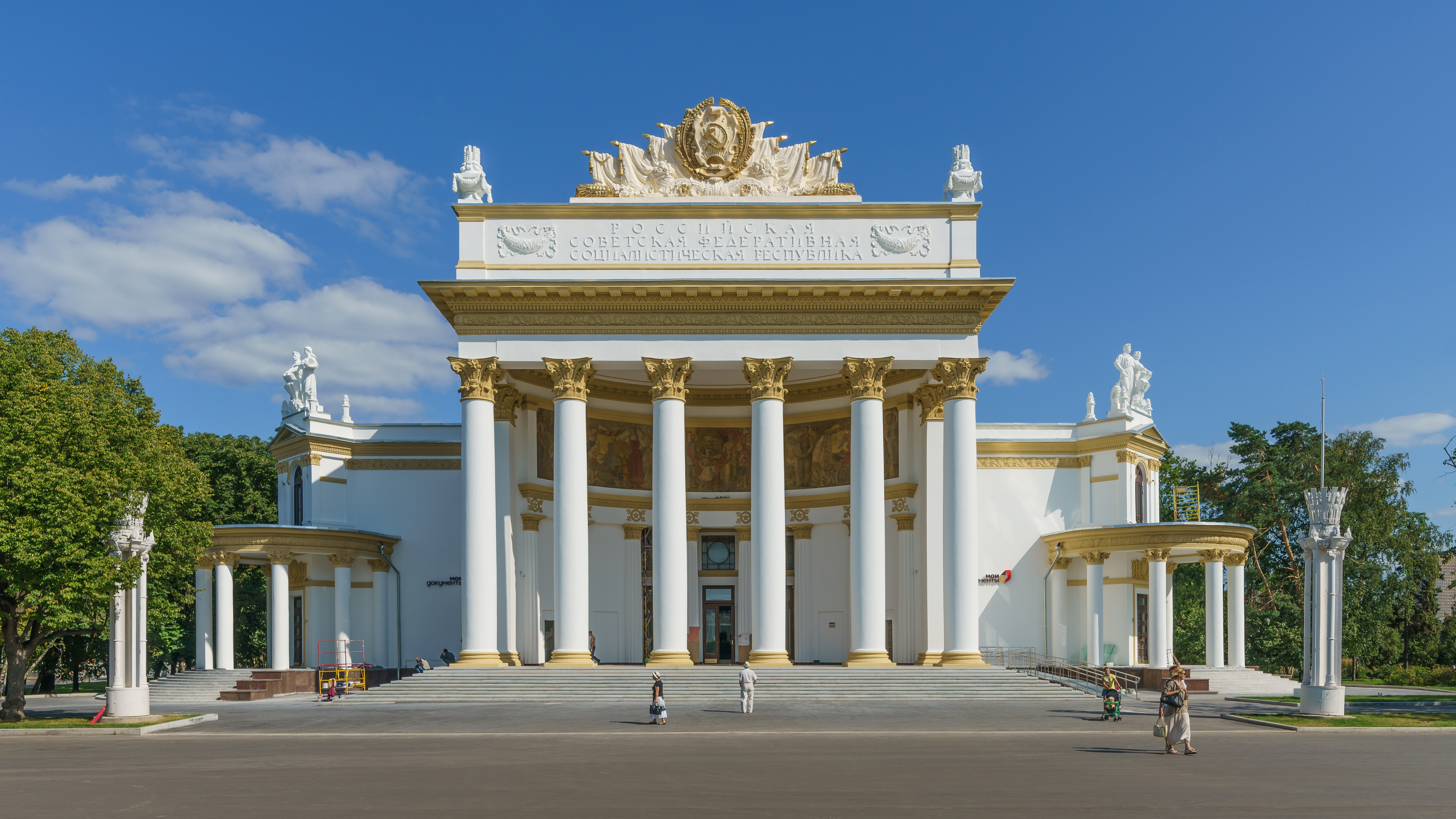
The Pavilion of Atomic energy

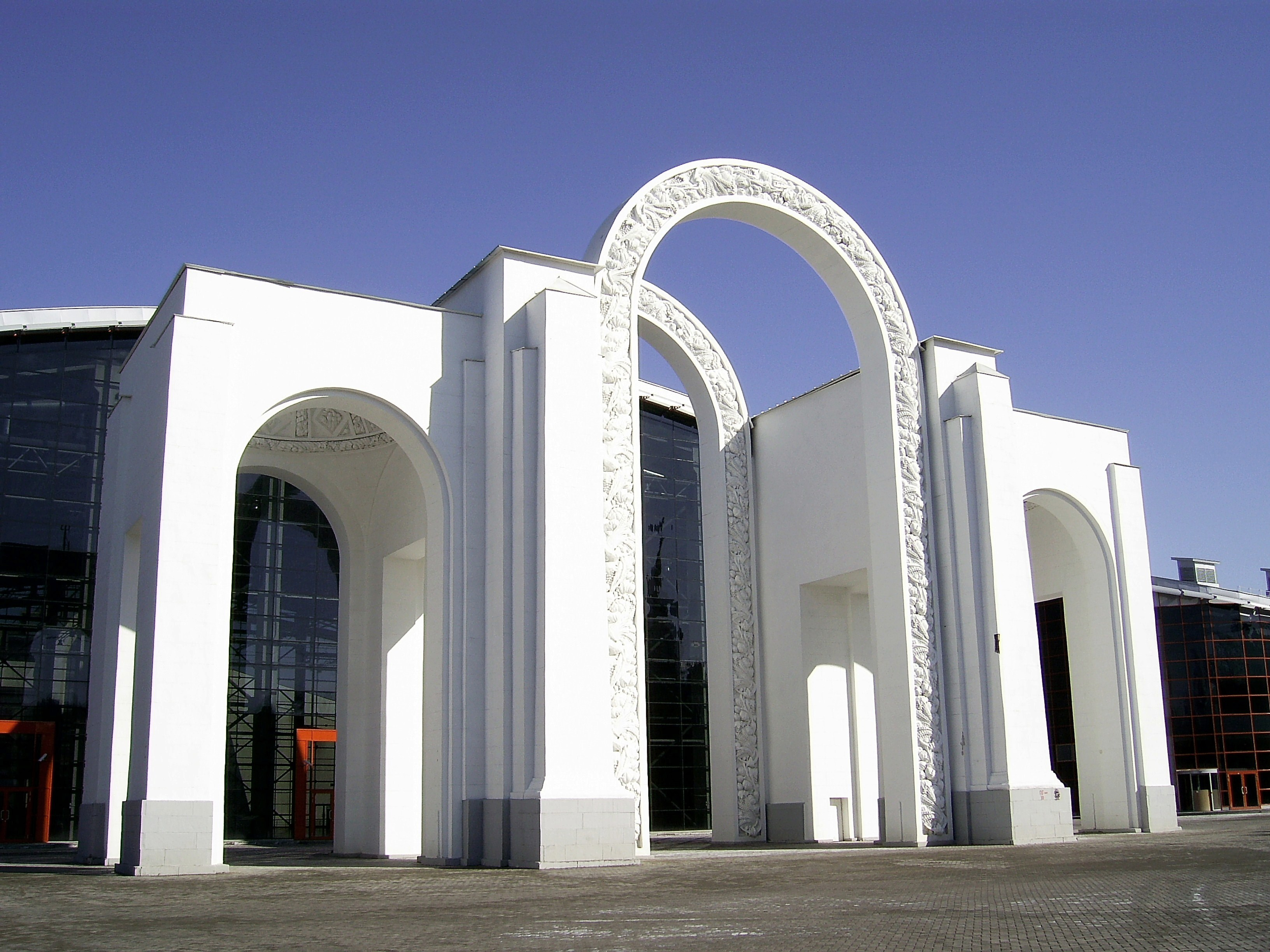
The old entrance gate to the exhibition centre

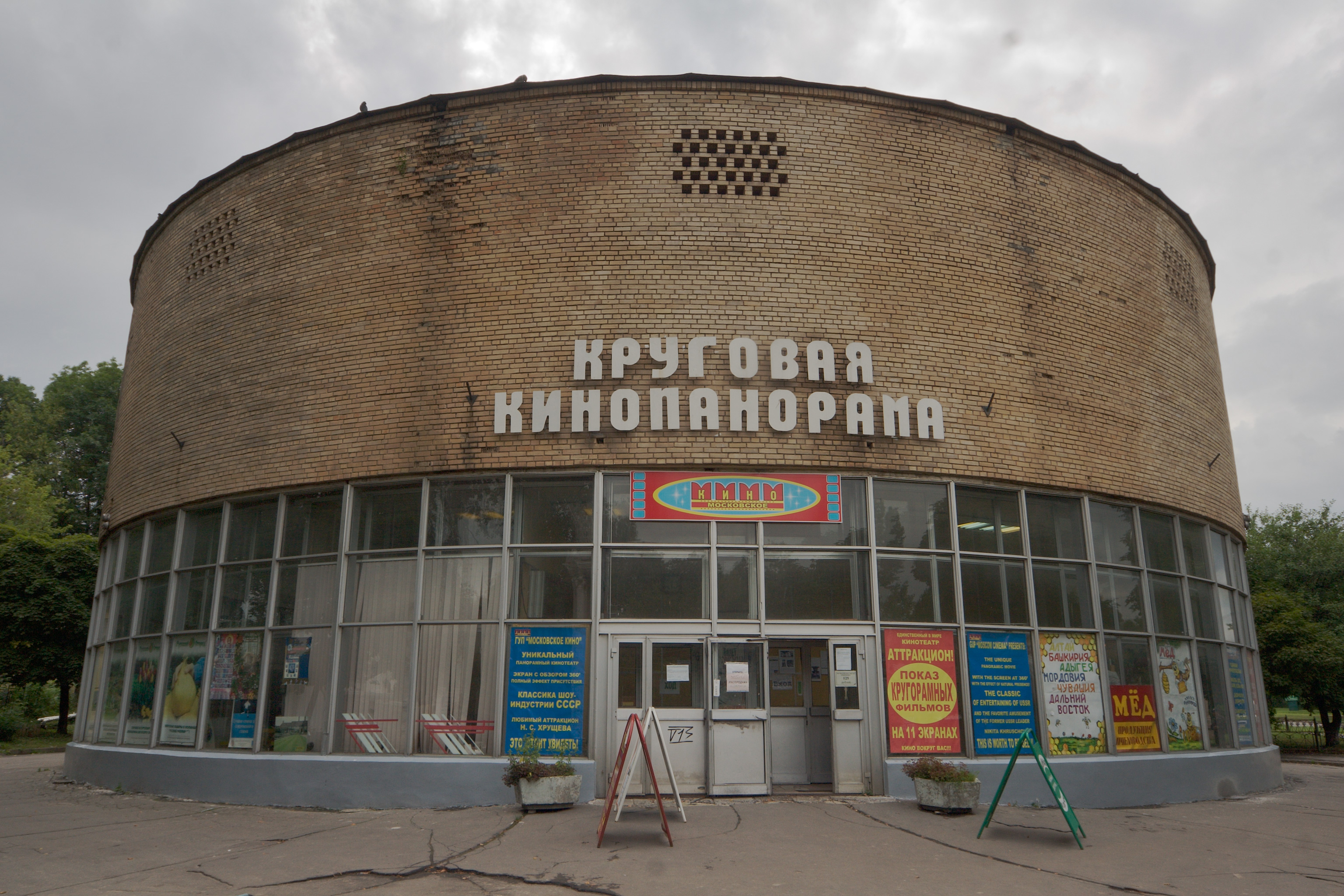
Cirkorama theatre

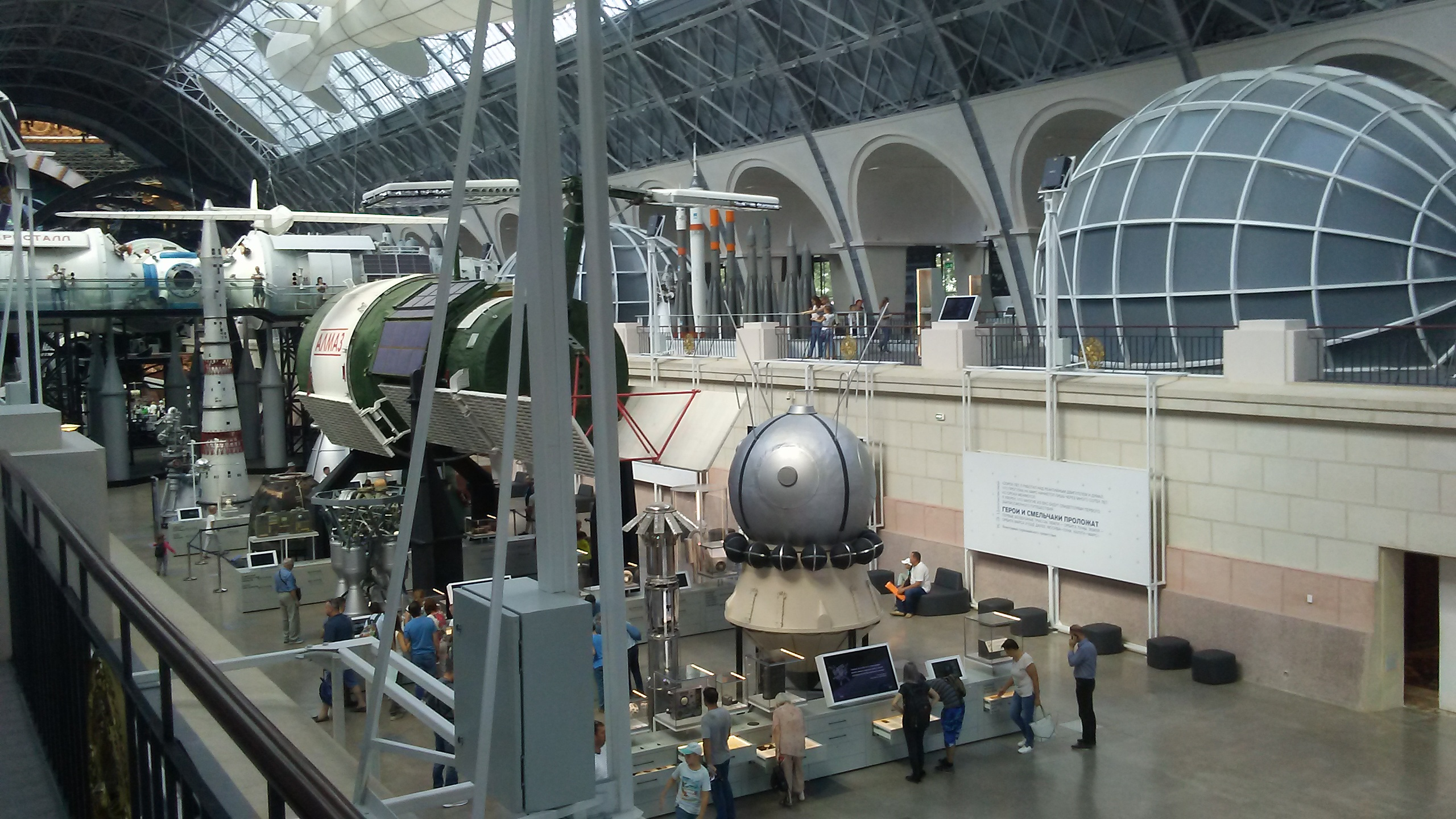
The Cosmonautics and Aviation Centre located in the Cosmos pavilion

== The site ==
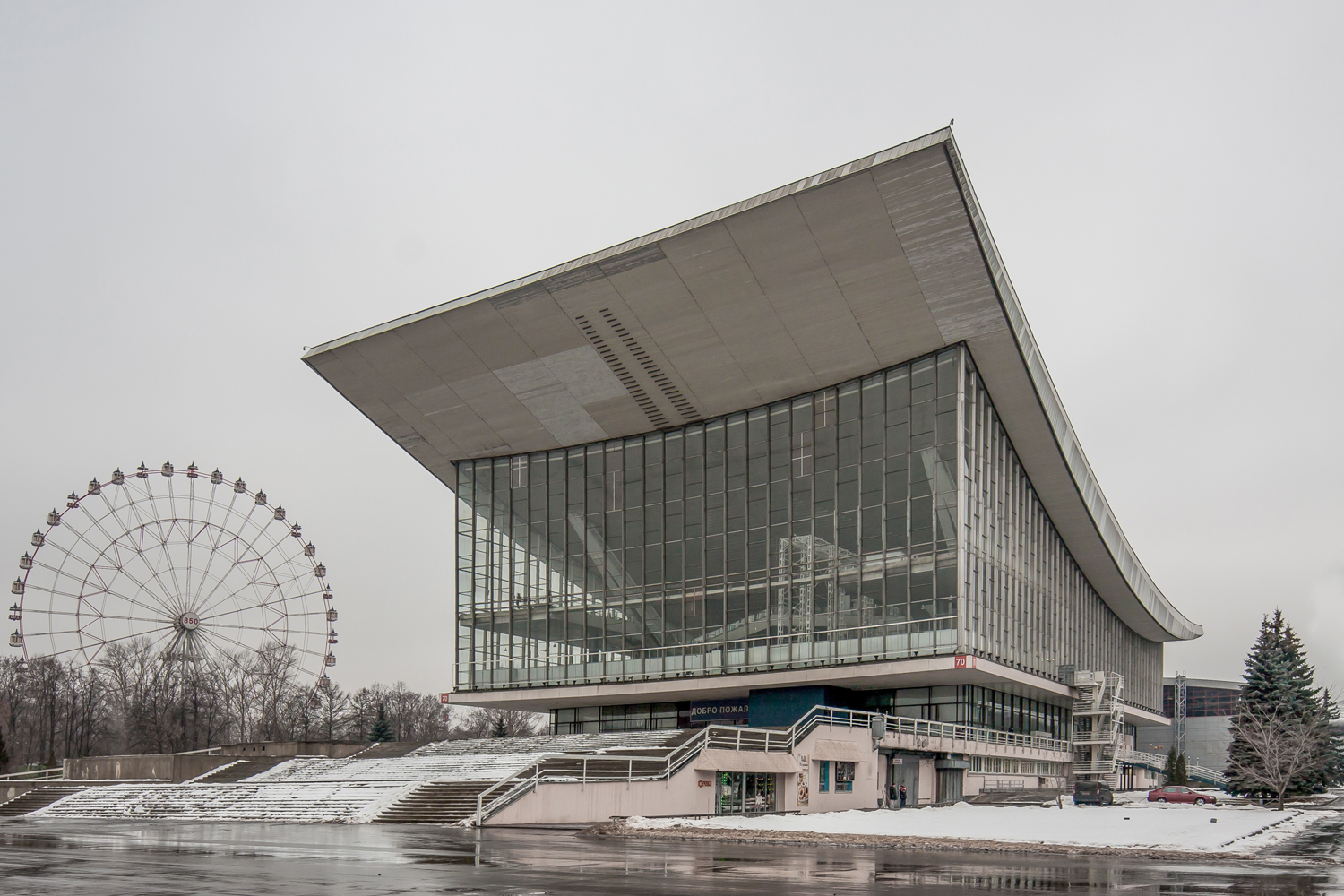
The Expo 67 Soviet pavilion was disassembled after that fair closed, and moved to Moscow to become the All-Russia Exhibition Centre - today "Moscow Pavilion".

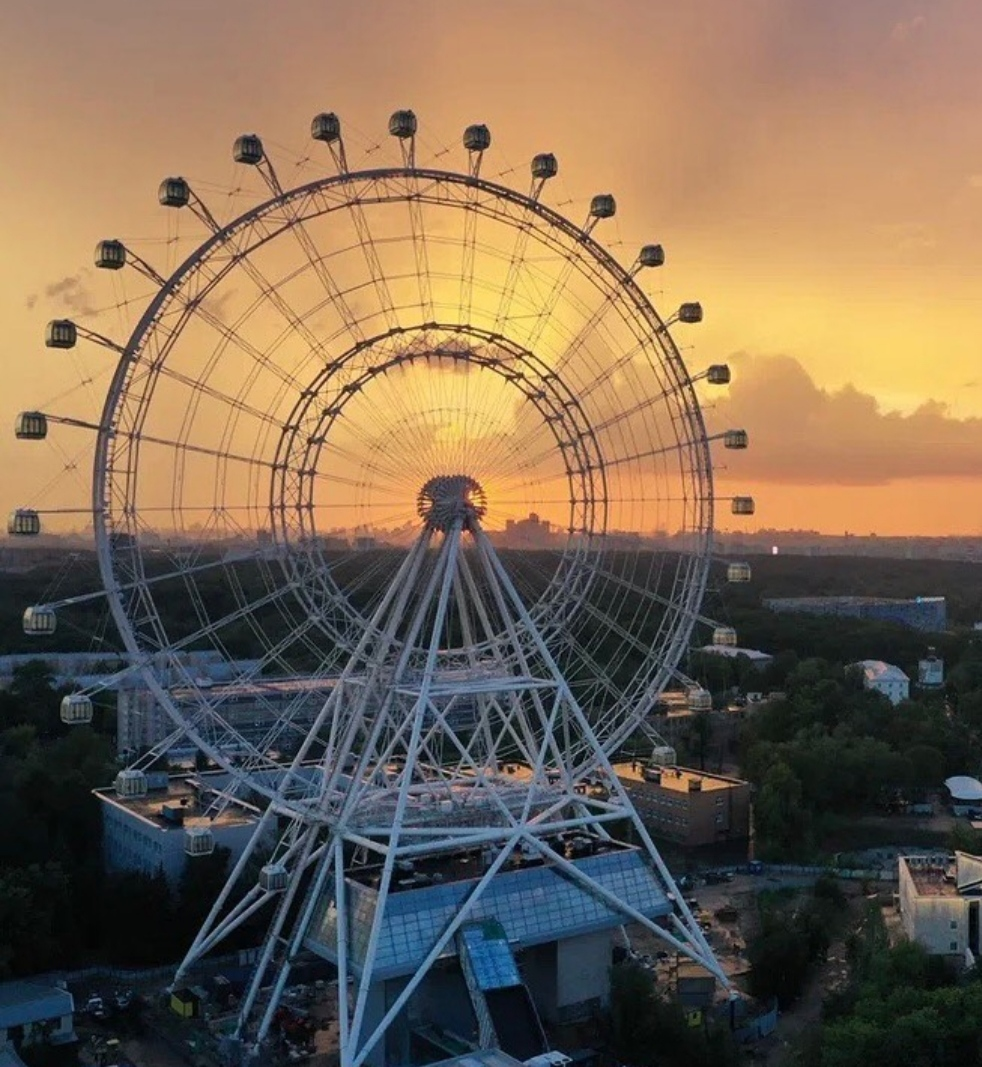
Sun of Moscow, Europe's tallest Ferris wheel.

The exhibition centre was built in the era of Joseph Stalin. The place selected was Moscow's northern suburb Ostankino. The main planner was Vyacheslav Oltarzhevsky who planned a central avenue with fountains, small roads and a large square facing the central pavilion at the end of the avenue. A statue of Vladimir Lenin used to stand in the front of the pavilion. There is a fountain called "The Stone Flower Fountain" facing the Ukraine Pavilion. There is a smaller square facing the Space Pavilion in the centre of which stood a Tupolev Tu-154 aircraft, placed there in 1976 after the pavilion of Agricultural Machinery became the Cosmos Pavilion. This aircraft was scrapped on 13 September 2008. A large statue of Joseph Stalin stood in the square until 1948. This had previously stood on the banks of the Moskva River in the city centre. The square is called The Industrial Square.

The Worker and Kolkhoz Woman sculpture was originally created to crown the Soviet pavilion of the 1937 World's Fair in Paris. The organizers had placed the Soviet and Nazi pavilions facing each other across the main pedestrian boulevard at the Trocadéro on the north bank of the Seine.

== See also ==
- Sokolniki Exhibition and Convention Centre
- Futurione

== Gallery ==
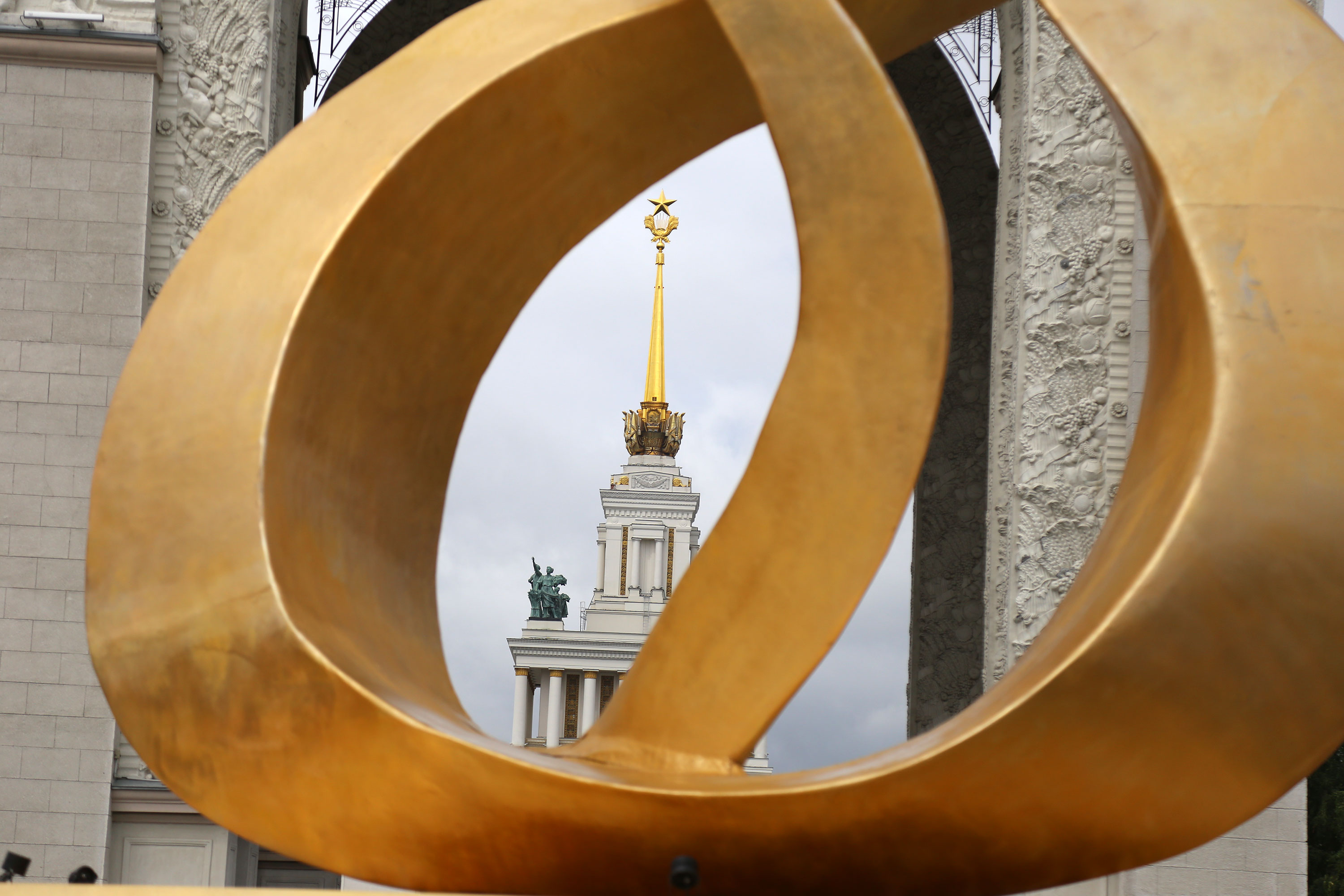
Main entrance arch VDNH, Moscow, Russia

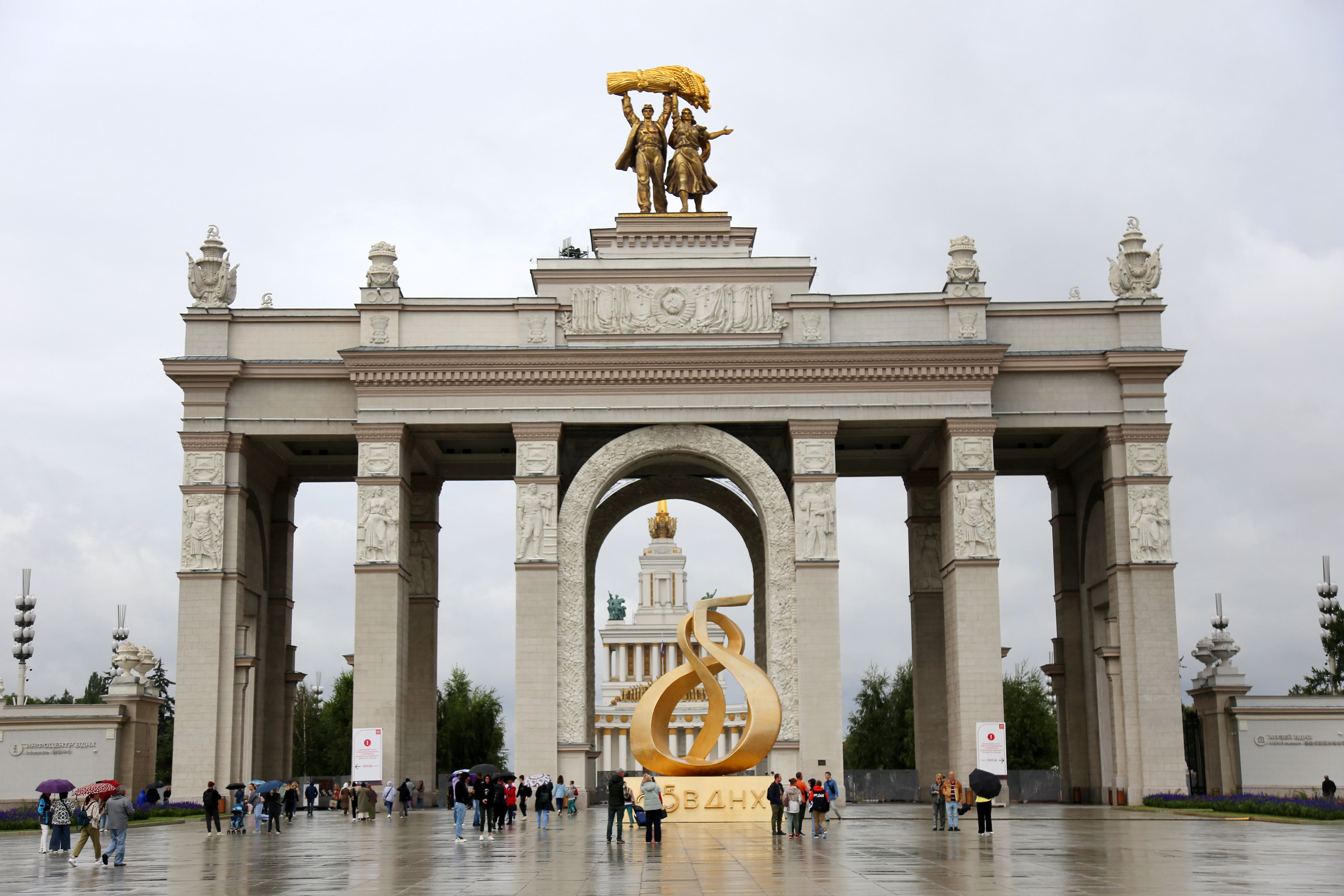
Main entrance arch VDNH, Moscow, Russia

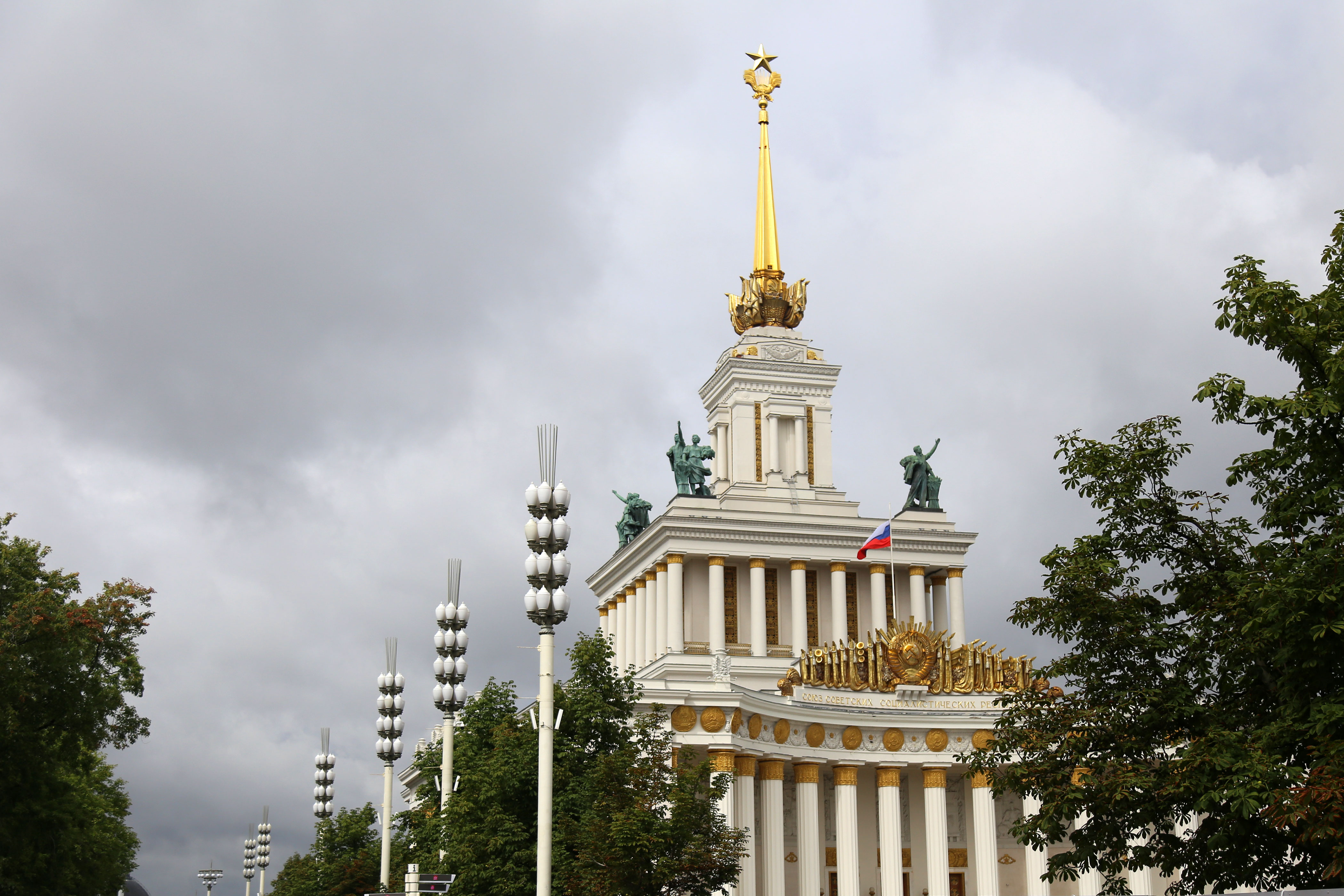
Pavilion № 1 Central, VDNKh, Moscow, Russia

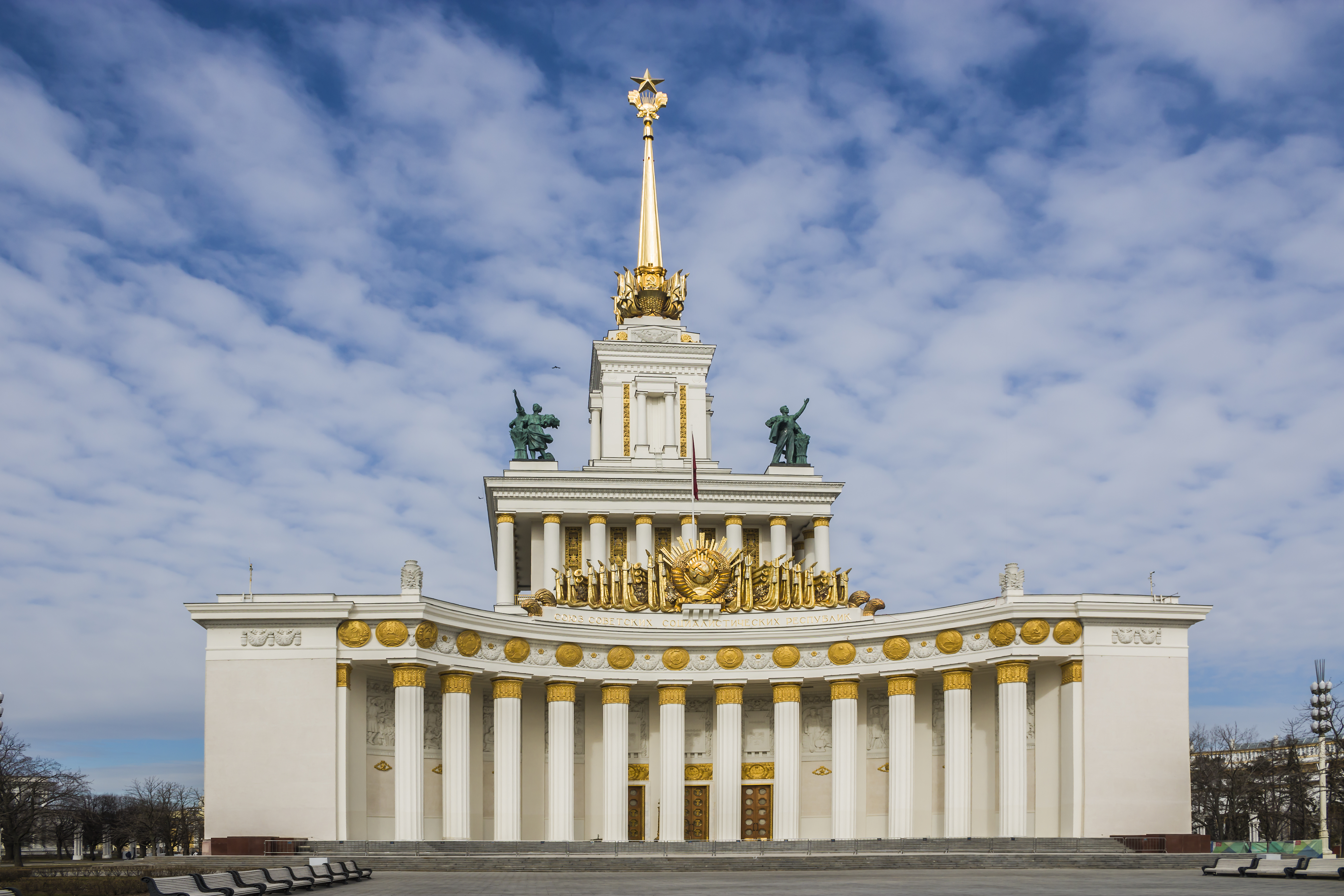

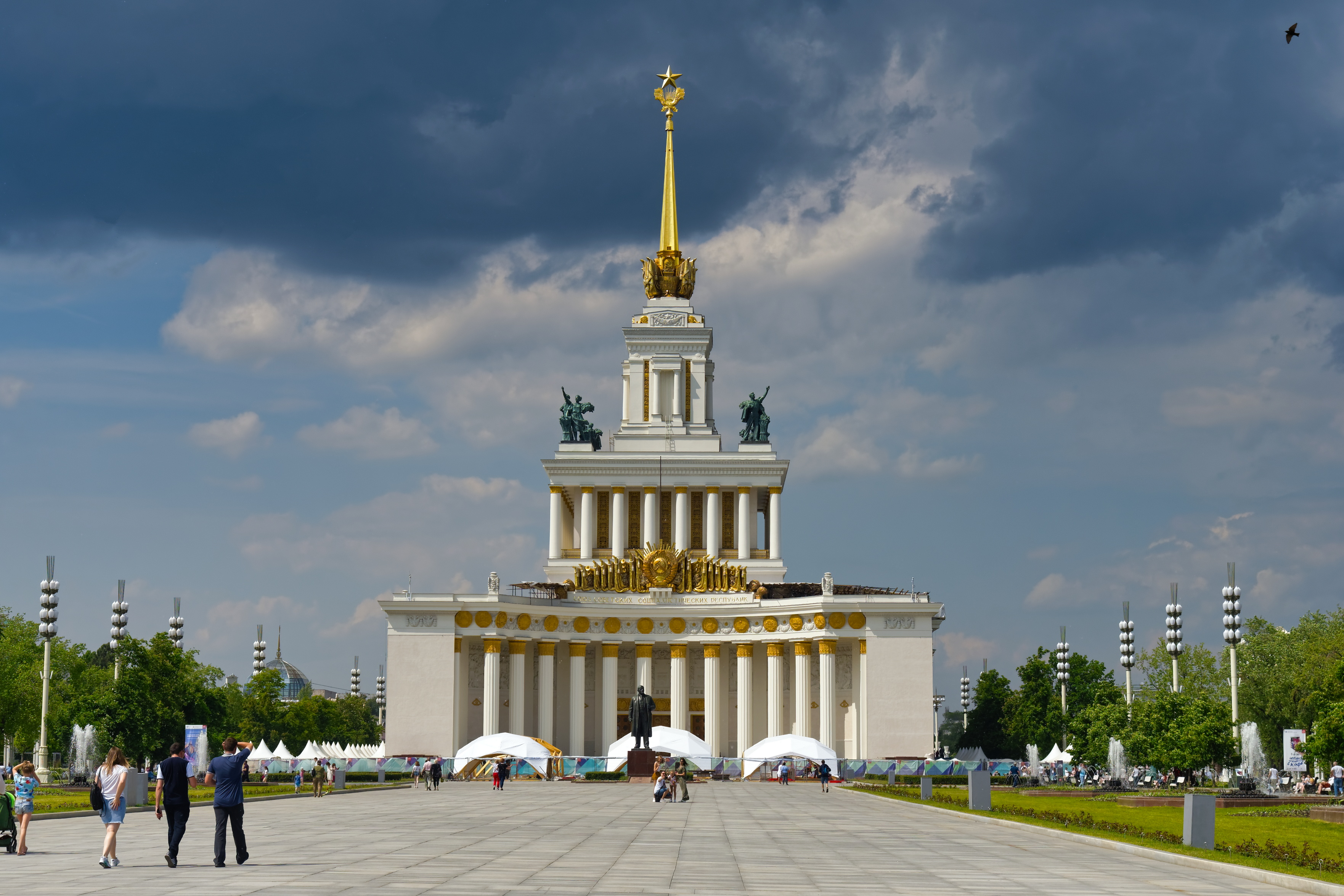

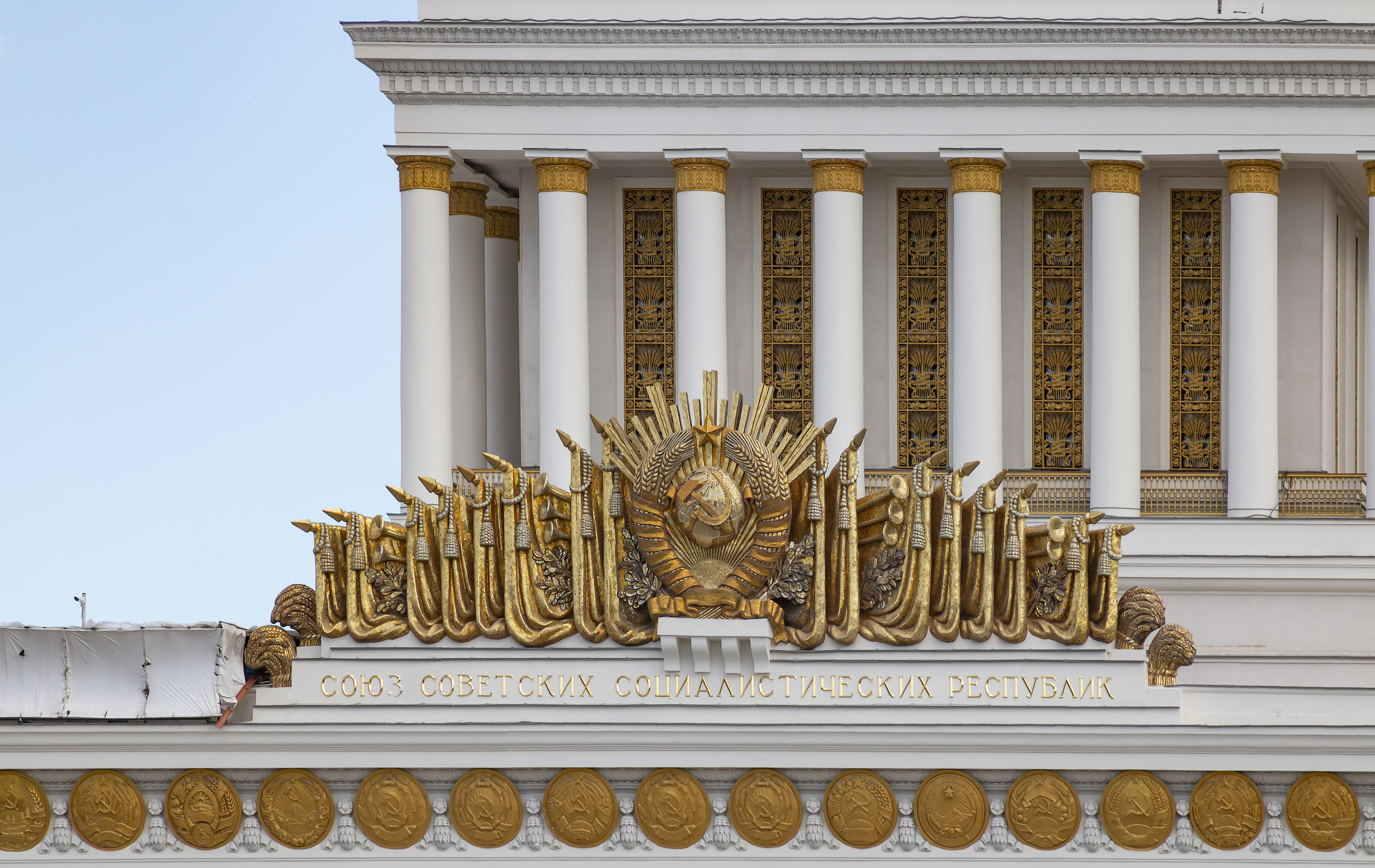
