= Stone Flower =

Stone Flower may refer to:

- The Stone Flower (Каменный цветок), a Russian Ural folk tale
  - The Stone Flower (1946 film), the first Soviet movie in color
  - The Stone Flower (1977 film), an animated adaptation of the story
  - The Stone Flower (Fridlender), a ballet based on the folk tale
  - The Tale of the Stone Flower (Prokofiev), a ballet
- Stone Flower (sculpture), a 1966 war memorial by Bogdan Bogdanović
- The Stone Flower Fountain, in Moscow, Russia
- Stone Flower (album), a 1970 album by Antonio Carlos Jobim
- Stone Flower Records, a record label established by Sly Stone of Sly & the Family Stone
- The Stone Flower, a 1982 novel by Alan Scholefield
- Black stone flower, Parmotrema perlatum, a lichen dried and used as a spice ingredient in India
- Stone flower, Didymocarpus pedicellata, a herb used in Ayurvedic medicine
- Lithops, also called pebble plants or living stones
