= Futurione =

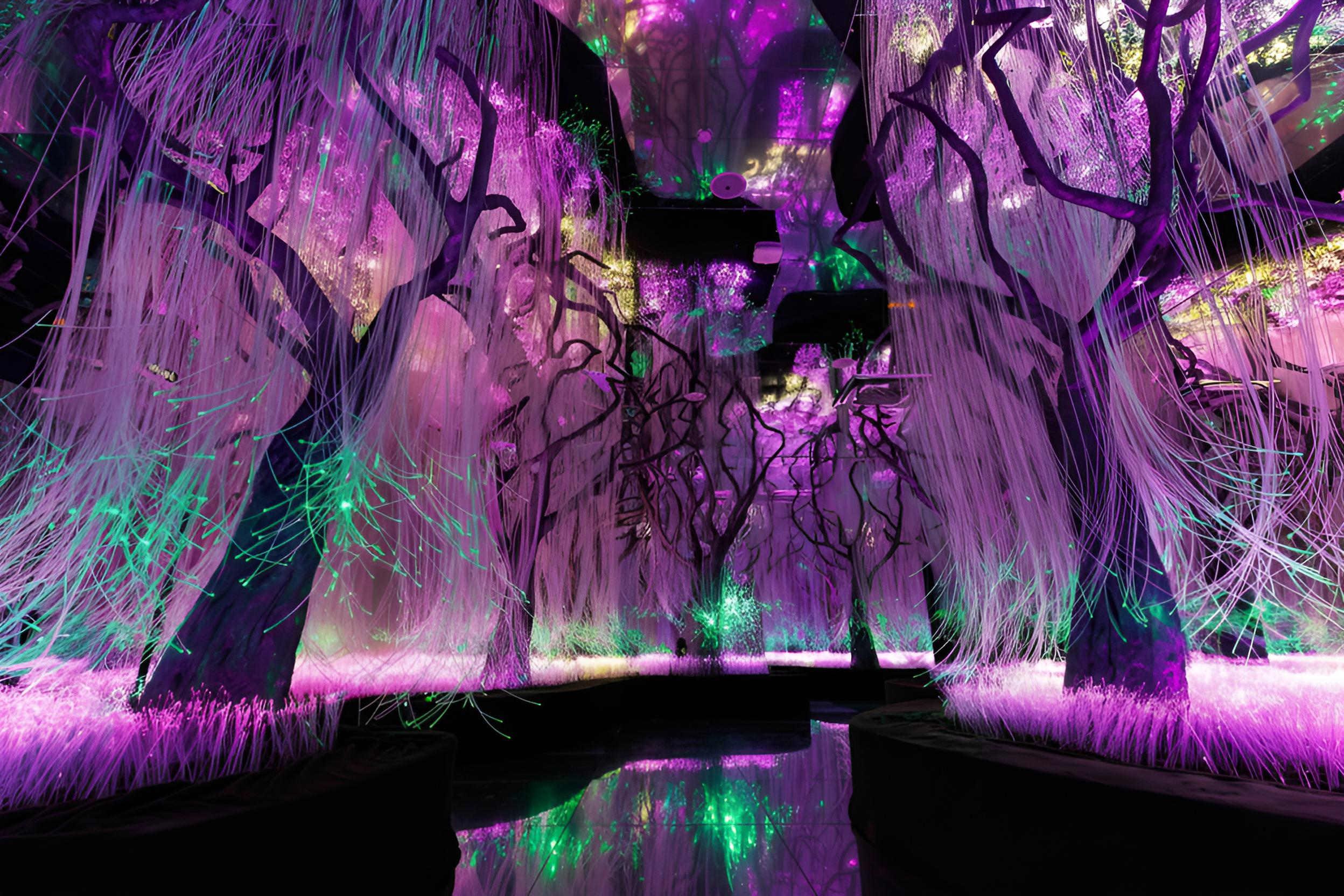
Futurione art space

Futurione is a digital art space, a museum dedicated to the art of the future. The museum's exhibition is created in a phygital concept that combines physical art objects with digital technologies.

The space was opened on the territory of the complex "Moscow Sun" in Moscow at VDNKh in autumn 2024. In November 2025, a similar venue Futurione Emotions was opened in Saint Petersburg in the shopping and entertainment center "PIK".

The Futurione team, a Skolkovo resident, has developed Russian software for managing the fidgital space.

== Description ==
=== Moscow ===
There are 5 halls featuring various activities and art objects. The total occupied area is over 2,000 m², which contains 1 million fiber-optic threads, 120,000 LEDs, 1,000 glass spheres, and 3,000 orchids. The exhibition is organized as a labyrinth, divided into five themed halls.

Before the main exhibition begins, there is a five-meter futuristic waterfall that creates anticipation for the upcoming journey into the future. The first hall in the exhibition is the mirror transforming hall "Immersion," where the first encounter with the future takes place—an immersion into a world of fantasies. This hall features a stage with seatings for concerts, public talks, and other events. The second hall is "Expansion," where among millions of shining particles, attention shifts from the external to the inner world. In the third hall, "Action," visitors are transported to another dimension, into the future where bold dreams are realized by humans and technology. In the fourth hall, "Imagination," the climax occurs with rich aromas, glowing grass, and a giant fiber-optic tree. The effect of being in another reality is created. In the fifth greenhouse hall, "Meaning," there are live orchids that complete the journey through the world of the present and the future. In this hall, visitors relax and contemplate what they have seen, observing the beauty of the living nature and the dancing flowers. In addition to the main exhibition, there is also a Secret Room that can be visited after walking through the halls. In the Secret Room, guests learn about the art space and participate in multimedia tea ceremonies. Classic tea varieties, edible flower sets, and desserts are served. The entire process is accompanied by visual special effects.

=== Saint Petersburg ===
The exhibition features seven multimedia halls. The exhibition begins with the "Magic Garden" hall, where the scenery comes to life. The hall has grass and fiber-optic light trees that transport visitors to a planet from another galaxy. Next is the "Sphere" hall, in which it is located a three-meter multimedia sphere, followed by "Delight" with a volumetric screen made of thousands of LED threads. Then come the light tunnels "Flow of Emotions" and "Infinity." The exhibition concludes with the "Emotions of Sound" hall, which has soft walls and audio content with sound effects. In the exhibition there is a special "Terrace" area with a view of the historic part of Saint Petersburg, where various events are held. There is also a Secret Room where multimedia tea ceremonies are conducted.

I've traveled a lot and visited around 76 countries, about 50 multimedia museums and phygital spaces in New York, Miami, Los Angeles, Tokyo, and Sydney. And I always thought how great it would be if something similar were created in Russia. Then I decided to do it myself, together with investors: and now, in the first year, we've already had 300,000 visitors at VDNKh. Now we want the venue to become a center of attraction in St. Petersburg, too.

— Ivan Shvaikov, founder of the Futurione

== Events ==
On October 1, 2025, Futurione opened the exhibition "Networks," organized by the Moscow School of Cinema (MSK) of Universal University. The project demonstrates the ability of film artists to work in the field of contemporary art.

On February 8, 2026, the art space hosted a conversation between the robot PROMOBOT and Russian scientists.

== See also ==
- Sokolniki Exhibition and Convention Centre
