= Sun of Moscow =

- Солнце Москвы
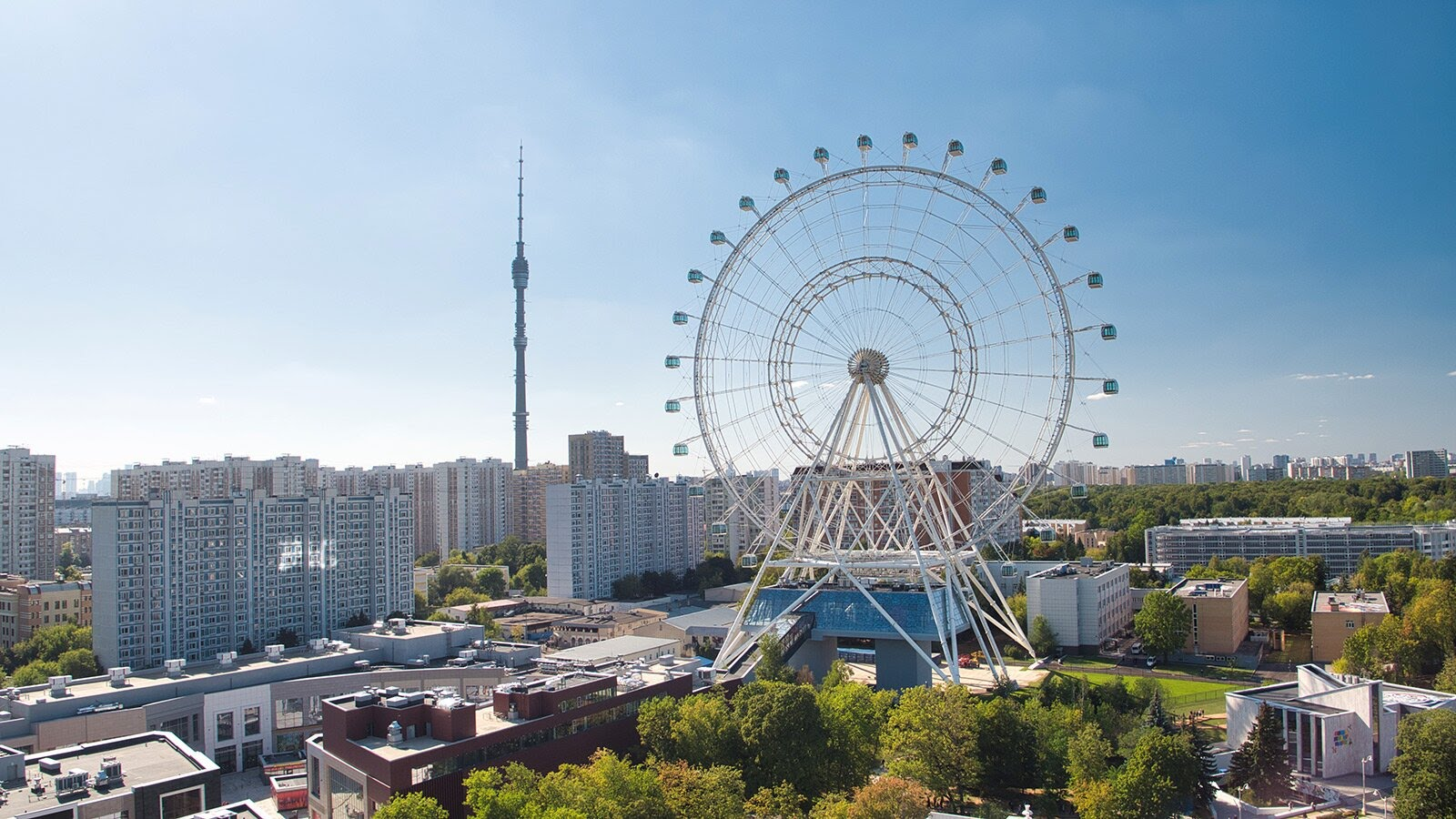

General information
- Status: Operating
- Type: Observation wheel
- Location: VDNH, 2nd Ostankinskaya Street, 3, Moscow, Russia
- Construction started: November 2020
- Completed: July 2022
- Opened: 10 September 2022

Height
- Height: 140 metres (460 ft)

Dimensions
- Diameter: 90 metres (300 ft)

Website
- en.moscow-sun.ru

The Sun of Moscow (Russian: Солнце Москвы, romanized: Solntse Moskvy) is a panoramic wheel in VDNKh park, Moscow, Russia. It was constructed in 2022 as a replacement for previously dismantled Moscow-850. The wheel opened on the City Day 11 September 2022, when Moscow's 875th anniversary was celebrated.

At 140 m high minus the height of the elevated platform, it became the tallest Ferris wheel in Russia and in Europe, surpassing London Eye (135 m) in raw height, while still smaller in diameter. It is still the 6th tallest Ferris wheel in the world

The total weight of the parts is about 1,500 tons. The wheel has 30 cabins. Each of them weighs 4300 kilograms and can accommodate up to 15 people. One revolution takes 18 minutes 40 seconds. Visibility from the wheel is about 50 kilometers (31 miles).

There were concerns among locals about the safety, noise, and possible ecological impact of the wheel on its surroundings. The launch of the wheel was plagued with technical issues.

== See also ==
- List of Ferris wheels
