= Moscow-850 =

Giant Ferris wheel in Moscow

Coordinates: 55.82786°N 37.64020°E

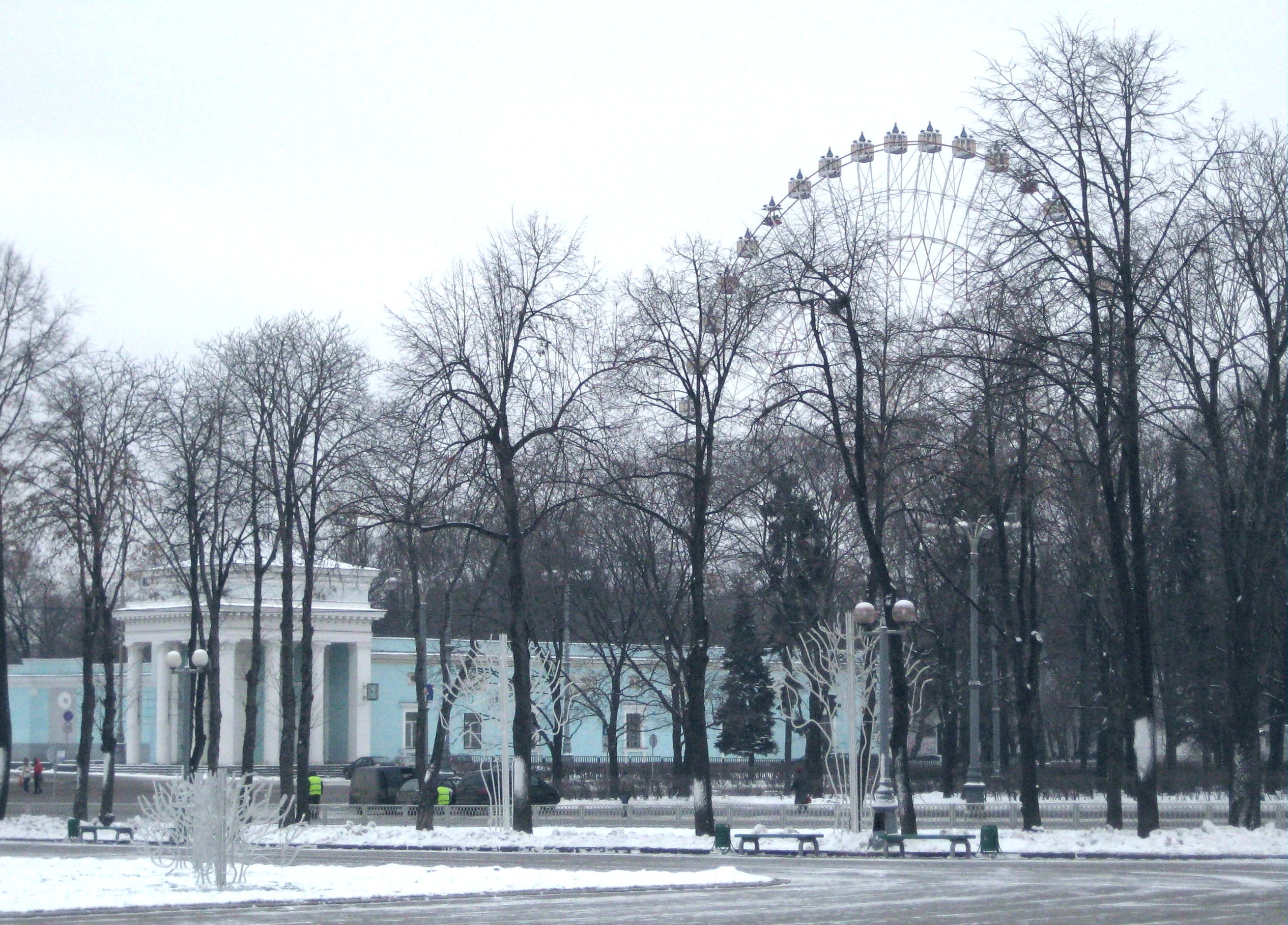
Wheel and VDNKh in winter

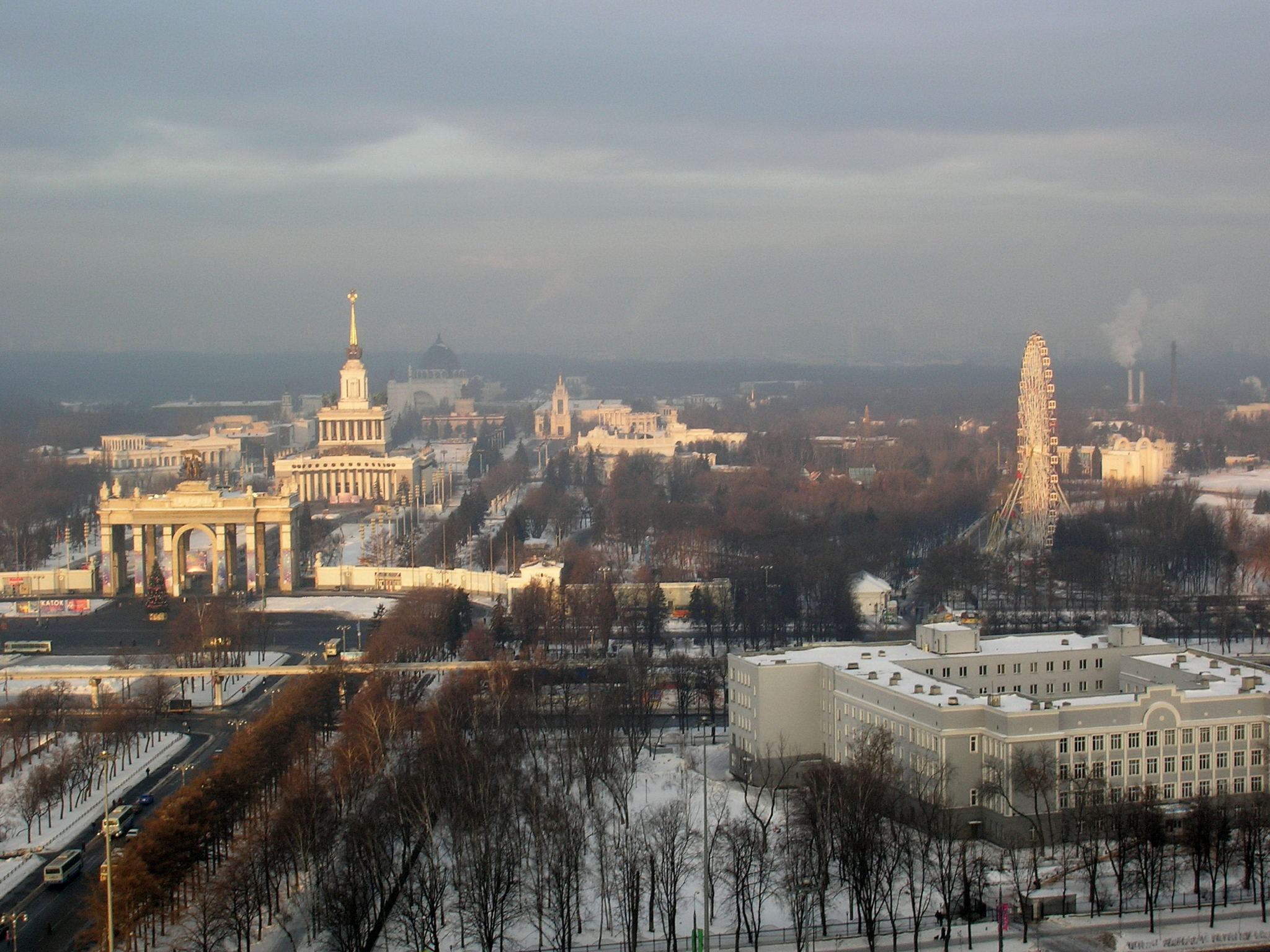
View of the wheel and VDNKh

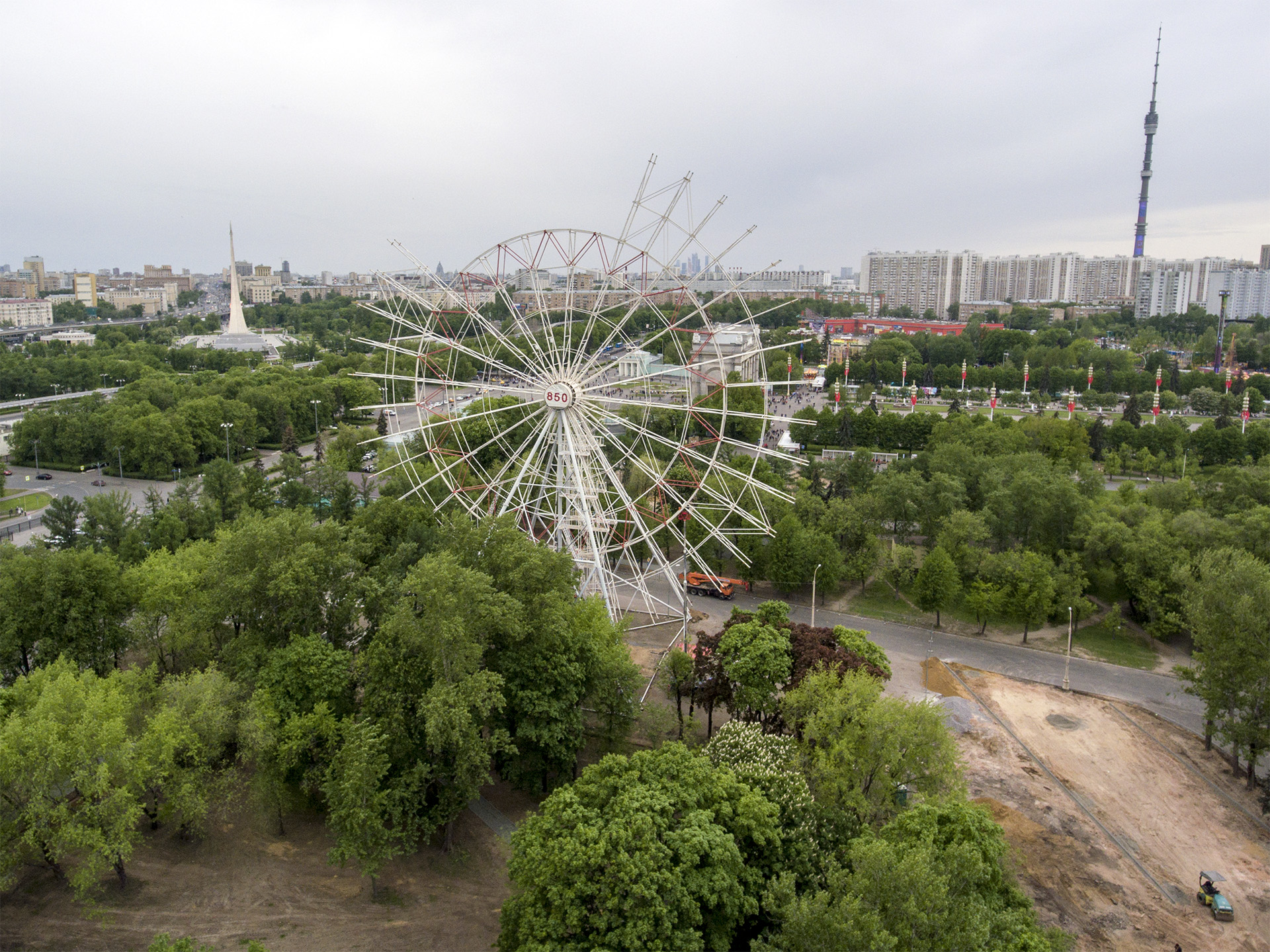
Dismantling the wheel

Moscow-850 (Russian: Колесо имени 850-летия Москвы) was a Ferris wheel in the amusement park "Moscow-850" on the territory of VDNKh (Exhibition of Achievements of National Economy), built for the 850th anniversary of Moscow. It was dismantled in 2016 and was replaced in 2022 by Sun of Moscow.

Moscow-850 had a diameter of 70 metres (230 ft) and an overall height of 73 metres (240 ft), made a full turn in 7 minutes, was equipped with 40 cabins, accommodating 8 people each. At the time of its construction, Moscow-850 was the tallest extant Ferris wheel in Europe, but in 1999 it was surpassed by the 90-metre Eurowheel at Mirabilandia, Italy. Moscow-850 was the tallest Ferris wheel in Russia until an 80-metre wheel opened in Lazarevskoye, near Sochi, in 2012.

The wheel was designed by an engineer Vladimir Gnezdilov on the initiative of the Moscow mayor's office and installed in 1995 by the group of companies "Mir" which belonged to Gnezdilov. According to Gnezdilov, in 1994 he received an offer to develop the abandoned area of the territory of VDNKh and presented a project of an amusement park with attractions, the opening of which was symbolically timed to the forthcoming celebration of the 850th anniversary of Moscow. The project was discussed at the level of the city government and the Mayor Yuri Luzhkov suggested that the Ferris wheel would be the highest in Europe. In 1994, Gnezdilov concluded a land lease contract with VDNKh of 6 hectares for 49 years. In 1995 the park began to work, the wheel was launched for the celebration of the day of the city.

In 2010, a conflict arose between the tenant of the site (the "Russian Exhibition of Attractions", a subsidiary of the group "Mir") and the management of VDNKh. In numerous legal disputes Gnezdilov argued that because of the changes in land legislation in 1999, the tenant and landlord were asked to re-register the lease, but VDNKh refused to provide the necessary documents, which is why Rosregistration (The Federal Service for State Registration, Cadastre and Cartography) refused to register the contract. Formally, the contract did not come into force, but the tenant continued to pay rent and conduct business. In accordance with the position of VDNKh, without a valid agreement, the tenant was obliged to vacate the occupied territory. For three times due to a malfunction there were stops of attractions in the park "Moscow-850": the wheel stopped in 2009 and 2013, and in 2015 the roller coaster "Cobra" stopped while trolleys were passing through a "dead loop" with 4 passengers in them. This incident gave VDNKh (the name of the All-Russian Exhibition Center, VVTs, from 2014) an occasion to publicly announce the danger of using attractions.

In June 2015, the Moscow Arbitration Court granted the suit of VDNKh about the termination of the lease. "Russian Exhibition of Attractions" tried to challenge the decision in the Ninth Arbitration Court, and then lodged an appeal with the Arbitration Court of the Moscow District, which on February 3, 2016 considered the complaint and left the decision of the first and second instance courts in force. The dismantling of attractions began in March, the wheel was finally dismantled on July 7, 2016. The concept of development of the united territory of the VDNKh, the Botanical Garden and the Ostankino Park, developed in 2015, supposes the construction of a new 135-140 meter high Ferris wheel in the Park of the Future, which will occupy the southern part of the present VDNKh territory. Cafeterias, souvenir shops and a branch of the Madame Tussauds are planned to be located in stylobate of the new Ferris wheel. The group of companies "Regions" will invest in the construction.

A renewed wheel, Solntse Moskvy (Moscow Sun) was opened in September 2022.
