= Moscow Pavilion =

Coordinates: 55°49′44.43″N 37°38′30.21″E

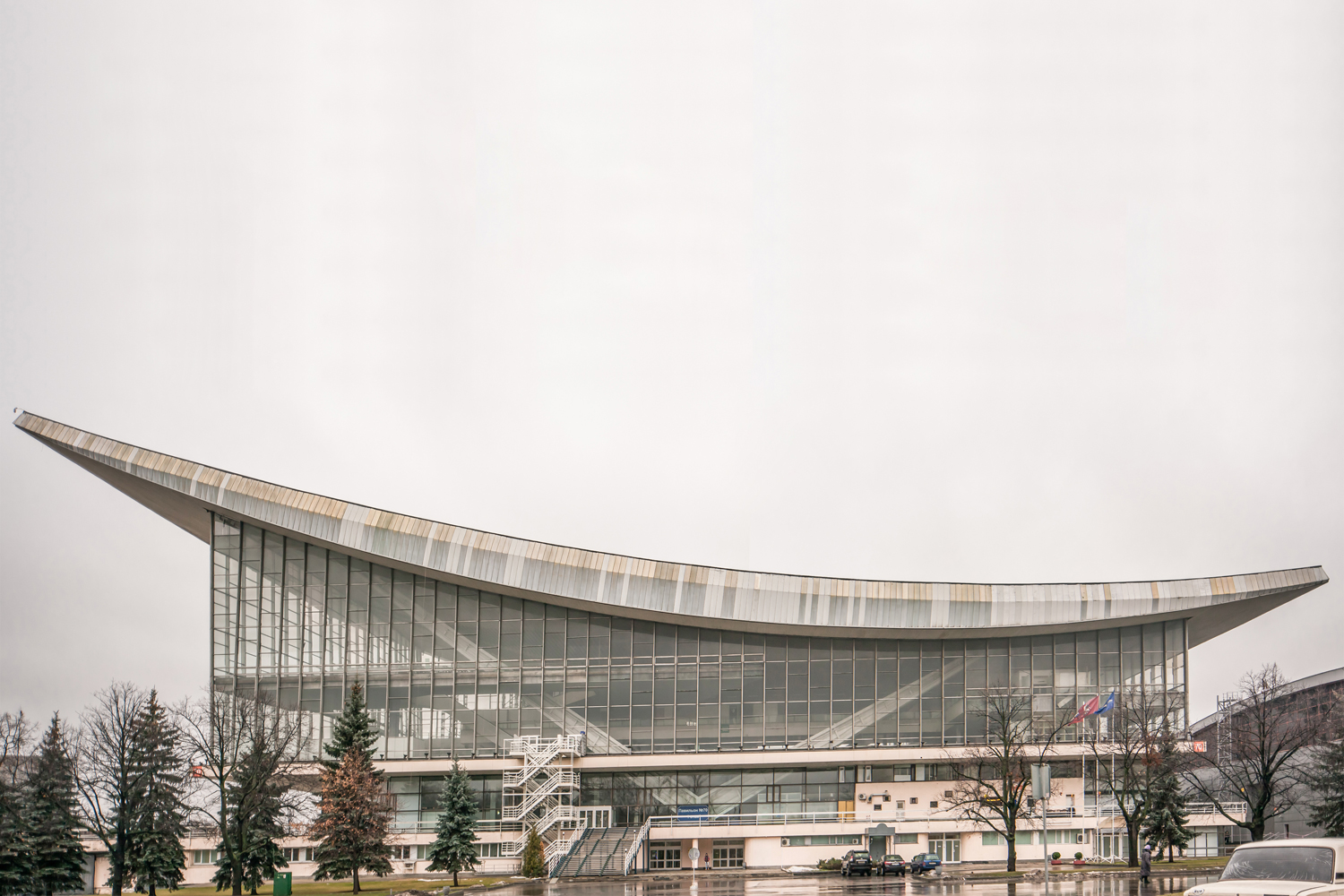

The Moscow Pavilion (former expo67 Pavilion) was designed as an exhibition pavilion for the Soviet Union at the international exhibition Expo 67 in Montreal, Quebec, Canada. The project was designed by a team of architects led by Mikhail Posokhin. Since the 1990s, the pavilion has been commonly called the Moscow Pavilion.
