= The Stone Flower Fountain =

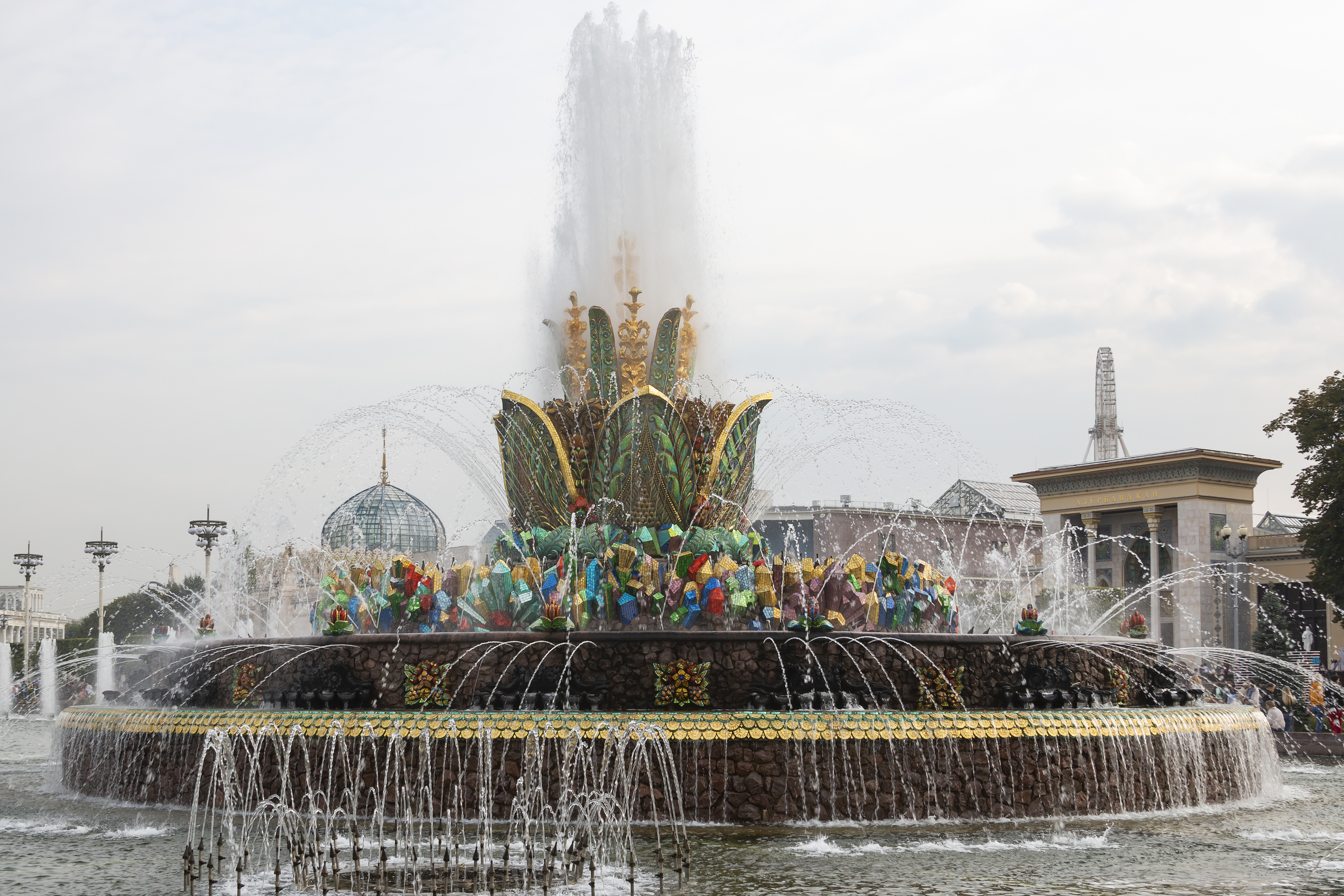
The Stone Flower Fountain

The Stone Flower Fountain (Russian: Фонтан «Каменный цветок», romanized: Fontan Kamennyj tsvetok) stands in the so-called "Industrial Square" of the Exhibition of Economic Achievements (VDNH) in Moscow, Russia. It was named and designed after the eponymous flower from Pavel Bazhov's fairy-tale "The Stone Flower".

The Stone Flower Fountain was built in 1954. It was designed by the architect Konstantin Topuridze and carved by Prokopy Dobrynin. The fountain was decorated with figures of birds, fruit and ears. Some sculpted details fountain created were carved by the sculptors Zoya Ryleyeva and V. V. Aleksandrova-Roslavleva, and the mosaics works were done in the workshop of the Soviet Academy of Arts. It was the first light and musical fountain in the USSR. The music for it was created by Dmitri Shostakovich. It was positioned in front of the Ukrainian pavilion.

== See also ==
- Friendship of the Peoples Fountain
- Worker and Kolkhoz Woman
