= The Malachite Box =

Book of Russian tales compiled by Pavel Bazhov

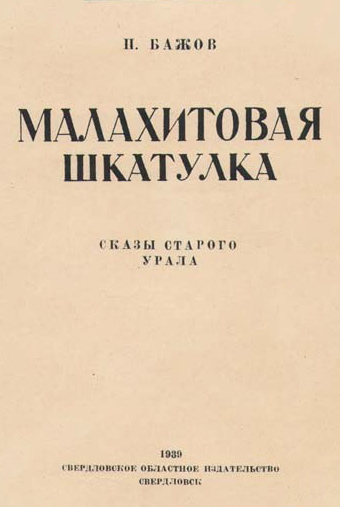
Title page of the 1st edition of The Malachite Box (as a single volume), 1939

The Malachite Box or The Malachite Casket (Russian: Малахитовая шкатулка, romanized: Malakhitovaya Shkatulka, IPA: [məlɐˈxʲitəvəjə ʂkɐˈtulkə]) is a book of fairy tales (skazka) and folk tales (also known as skaz) of the Ural region of Russia compiled by Pavel Bazhov and published from 1936 to 1945. It is written in contemporary language and blends elements of everyday life with fantastic characters. It was awarded the Stalin prize in 1942. Bazhov's stories are based on the oral lore of the miners and gold prospectors.

The first edition of The Malachite Box was published on 28 January 1939. It consisted of 14 stories and an introduction, which contained some information about the life, industry and culture of the Urals and which the author tried to include into every edition of the collection. Later versions contained more than 40 stories. Not all stories are equally popular nowadays. The most popular tales were written between 1936 and 1939: "The Mistress of the Copper Mountain" and its continuation "The Malachite Casket", "The Stone Flower" and its continuation "The Master Craftsman", "Silver Hoof", "Cat's Ears", "Sinyushka's Well", "The Manager's Boot-Soles". Among the later stories, "A Fragile Twig" (1940), "The Fire-Fairy" (1940), "Tayutka's Mirror" (1941), "Ivanko Krylatko" (1943), "That Spark of Life" (1943) are popular. The characters of the Ural Mountains folklore such as the Mistress of the Copper Mountain became very well known after their appearance in Pavel Bazhov's The Malachite Box.

== Background ==
In the 1930s the Communist Party of the Soviet Union greatly encouraged the interest in the past of the country and the people. The Party paid a lot of attention to the development of the historical science. Maxim Gorky initiated the publication of such books as The History of Factories and Plants (Russian: История фабрик и заводов, romanized: Istorija fabrik i zavodov). The initiative was supported by the Communist Party. History books and various historical fiction titles were published one after another. General interest in the history of the country transformed into the interest in folk art and folklore. The famous folklore expert Nikolay Andreyev later wrote about that period that the folklore collections "have never been published before in such quantities, not even in the "Golden Age" of the folkloristics in the 60s". Journalists, students, and members of Komsomol started collecting folklore. At the First Congress of Soviet Writers Maxim Gorky reminded the writers that "the art of words begins with folklore" and encouraged them to collect and study it. It was supposed to be used as a model example of the literature.

== Overview ==
Pavel Bazhov was born in the Urals. He knew its geography, topography, natural resources, and was very proud of both the beauty of the Urals and its people. He stated that his main reason for writing was to suppress the pain after the loss of his only son Alexey in 1935. Mark Lipovetsky believed the tense situation in the author's life could partially explain the depth and the sombre tone of his early tales, which made them so popular among the adult readers. He suggested that the tales carried the sign of deep terror and trauma, which Bazhov endured between January 1937 and 1938, and noted that The Malachite Box "is filled with unprecedented for Soviet (and especially children's) literature horror". At that time Bazhov was fired from Sverdlovsk Publishing House, where he had worked since 1931, and expelled from the Communist Party for "glorification of people's enemies" in his recent book. His past as a member of the Socialist Revolutionary Party and a seminary teacher was also questionable. He was once summoned for interrogation by NKVD, but luckily his investigator was arrested the day before the meeting. The author was reinstated in the Communist Party in 1938. Nevertheless, a lot of the stories were written between January 1937 and 1938. Bazhov later said: "It happened to be such a black stripe that I was at loose ends. So I started to work on some old ideas." During the Great Patriotic War (1941–1945) Bazhov switched to the patriotic tales, the task that he considered his duty as the patriot. The distinctive feature of the later stories is the strengthening of the social motive, such as confrontation based on social class, and the decrease in poetic and supernatural scenarios.

The tales are told from the point of view of the imaginary Grandpa Slyshko (Russian: Дед Слышко, romanized: Ded Slyshko; lit. "Old Man Listenhere"). Slyshko is the old miner from a factory who remembered the Serfdom era. In the stories written at the end of the Great Patriotic War and in the post-war years, Bazhov introduced the new narrator. His new stories were told by a different type of the miner: the patriotic participant of the Russian Civil War who fought for the Red Army and later helped to build the new socialist society.

The tales can be divided into several groups: the series about craftsmen (the most famous tales are "The Stone Flower", "The Master Craftsman", "A Fragile Twig"); the tales about some mysterious forces, which contain surreal plots and mythical creatures ("The Mistress of the Copper Mountain", "The Malachite Casket", "Sinyushka's Well", "Cat's Ears"); the satirical tales about gold prospectors or greedy bailiffs ("The Manager's Boot-Soles", "Sochen and His Stones"); the tales about mine explorers ("Sinyushka's Well"). During the Great Patriotic War and in the post-war years, Bazhov started writing about Soviet armourers, steel-makers, and teemers, emphasizing the patriotic pride of the Russian workers. He also penned some stories about the Russian communist leaders, Vladimir Lenin and Joseph Stalin. Furthermore, Pavel Bazhov indicated that his stories can be divided into two groups based on tone: "child-toned" (e.g. "The Fire-Fairy", "Silver Hoof"), and "adult-toned" ("The Stone Flower", "Marko's Hill"). Denis Zherdev divided the stories into "gold" and "malachite" series, which begin with "Beloved Name" and "The Mistress of the Copper Mountain" respectively.

== Publication ==
In the mid-1930s Sverdlovsk Publishing House decided to publish the collection Prerevolutionary Folklore of the Urals (Russian: Дореволюционный фольклор на Урале, romanized: Dorevoljucionnyj folklor na Urale). In the summer of 1934 the folklorist Vladimir Biryukov was offered to make such a collection. The historian Andrey Ladeyshchikov became its chief editor. From August to December 1935 Biryukov collected folklore at the Ural Mountains. He was supposed to finish the book by January 1935, however, it was not completed on February. Biryukov wrote in the diary that "the classification, introduction, and the bibliography" were needed. Several sections of the collection were not yet ready as well. Biryukov mostly worked on songs, folk riddles, and fairy tales.

On 25 February 1935 Biryukov met with Yelizaveta Blinova, the new chief editor of Prerevolutionary Folklore of the Urals appointed instead of Andrey Ladeyshchikov. She insisted on including the folklore of the working class, although Biryukov claimed that it would be impossible to find. Blinova consulted with journalists, ethnographers, and writers (including Pavel Bazhov) and asked them to write down some workers' folklore. She added their stories to the collection. Blinova's initiative inspired Bazhov to start working on his stories. Bazhov, who was an employee of the same publishing house since 1931, suggested that she include some stories that he had heard at the Polevskoy Copper Smelting Plant from the miners' storyteller Vasily Hmelinin (Russian: Василий Хмелинин), nicknamed "Grandpa Slyshko" by children (slysh-ka literally means "Listen here!"). Bazhov later wrote about Blinova:

She raised a question: why were there no workers' folklore? Vladimir Pavlovich [Biryukov] replied that he had not been able to find it anywhere. I was dismayed: how can that be true? I've heard this workers' folklore in abundance, I've heard the whole skazy. And I brought to her "Beloved Name" as an example.

Pavel Bazhov had heard the skaz from Vasily Hmelinin in 1892–1895, and wrote it down from memory, trying to use the miners' natural language where possible, as he was always fascinated with miners' colloquialisms. His prerevolutionary records, which consisted of six notebooks, were lost during the Russian Civil War. Bazhov introduced Vasily Hmelinin in the stories as the narrator Grandpa Slyshko.

In July 1936 Blinova left Sverdlovsk Publishing House. Bazhov became the chief editor, only to be replaced by Ladeyshchikov again. The collection was eventually published under Ladeyshchikov's name in December 1936. There were three of Bazhov's stories in it: "Beloved Name", "The Great Snake", and "The Mistress of the Copper Mountain". Prior to the publication, the Detgiz employee Vladimir Lebedev saw his manuscript. He was very impressed by it, and published four stories ("Beloved Name", "The Great Snake", "The Mistress of the Copper Mountain", and "The Manager's Boot-Soles") in the 11th issue of the Krasnaya Nov literary magazine (1936).

Inspired by the success of the tales, Bazhov continued working on them. The tales "Sinyushka's Well", "Silver Hoof", and "The Demidov Caftans" were finished even before the publication of the first The Malachite Box edition. By 1938 the author finished 14 stories. Because of Bazhov's tense relationship with the Communist Party, they were published under two different pen names, either under the name "P. Bragin" or simply under his initials "P. B.". The name of Vasily Hmelinin was usually in the title as well.

The first edition of The Malachite Box was released in several versions. The first copy was presented to the author for his 60th birthday on 28 January 1939. Several test copies were published in January. A special deluxe edition, decorated with malachite, was sent to the 1939 New York World's Fair. The mass market edition published in autumn of the same year. The book was an instant success. It has been republished many times. Overall, twenty three editions of the stories were released from 1941 to 1945. The second edition of the collection was released by the Moscow publishing house Sovetsky Pisatel in 1942. The book was awarded the Stalin prize. The third edition of The Malachite Box was released by Goslitizdat in 1944; the fourth by Sverdlovsk Publishing House in 1944; the fifth edition by Sovetsky Pisatel in 1947; the sixth by Goslitizdat in 1948; the seventh by Sverdlovsk Publishing House in 1949. The eighth was the last edition of The Malachite Box to be published during Bazhov's lifetime in 1950. In 1950 his decaying eyesight made the writing difficult. The last story "Zhabrei's Path" was published after his death. According to the All-Union Book Chamber's data as of 1 January 1981, the books in the Soviet Union were republished 253 times with a total circulation of about 37 million copies. The Malachite Box has been republished many times since then.

=== Translations ===
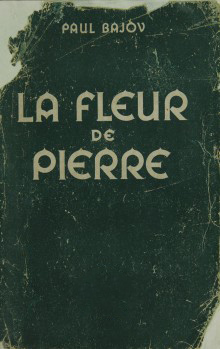
The cover of the 1947 French edition of The Malachite Box

The tales were translated into 64 languages, more than 250 editions in foreign languages were released. The list of languages include English, Hungarian, Italian, Bulgarian, Serbo-Croatian, Mongolian, Chinese, Japanese, Assamese, Kannada. Four stories from The Malachite Box were published in the 1943 Moscow magazine Internatsionalnaya Literatura in English and French. In 1944 the book was translated from Russian into English by Alan Moray Williams and published by Hutchinson. Bazhov did not know about this translation and found out about it accidentally. In the early 1940s "The Mistress of the Copper Mountain" and "The Stone Flower" were translated into Italian. Bazhov mentioned that he had heard about it from "either folklorist or translator Lesnaya". In the letter as of 25 February 1945 he wrote:

Shortly before the war she told me about the Italian "Floro [sic] di Pietra" ("The Stone Flower") and something like "Madonna of the Mountains" ("The Mistress of the Copper Mountain"). It was rather amusing. She promised to give me the book. But did not keep the promise.

Bazhov never saw this book, and even museum workers were unable to locate it. The Malachite Box in Italian was republished in 1978 by La Scuola as Racconti russi, a cura di R. Molteni Grieco (lit. "Russian fairy tales, edited by R. Molteni Grieco").

In 1946 the book was translated into Bokmål and released in Norway by Falken Forlag (as "Steinblomsten"). Several stories were translated into Chinese and published in the Shanghai literary magazine in 1946. In 1947 it was released in French as "La Fleur de pierre", published by Editions du Bateau Ivre. Another English translation was made in the 1950s by Eve Manning. In all, the stories have been published in English at least four times.

Bazhov was very interested in the translations. He called them "the walks in alien places". He was also concerned about the ideological aspects of his work and the possible changes that could happen in translation. He helped translators when he could, explaining the meaning of some Ural colloquialisms.

=== Illustrations ===
The first edition of the collection was illustrated by Alexander Kudrin. Bazhov favored the second edition, released by Sovetsky Pisatel in 1942, because of the illustrations created by Konstantin Kuznetsov. However he criticized Kuznetsov for depicting Silver Hoof as a domestic goat, and was generally extremely demanding when it came to details. On another occasion he was disappointed with the picture of Danilo the Craftsman in bast shoes, because miners did not wear them. Among the other illustrators he liked Oleg Korovin, Yekaterina Gilyova and Vasiliy Bayuskin.

== The question of authorship ==
In Prerevolutionary Folklore of the Urals Bazhov was noted as the one who collected the texts, yet in the Krasnaya Nov magazine he was listed as their original author. The question of authorship arose soon after the publication. Some critics considered the stories pure folklore, others thought of it was a literary work penned by Bazhov. Unfortunately the Soviet folkloristics was underdeveloped, at that time there were no specific criteria of distinguishing literature from folklore.

The question of authorship arose every time a new story was released, and is still discussed nowadays. Before the stories were released as a single volume on 28 January 1939, the issue became urgent. The publisher was concerned with the title of the book and the author's name. It was suggested to release the book as The Tales from Grandpa Slyshko (Russian: Сказы дедушки Слышко, romanized: Skazy dedushki Slyshko), as if Vasily Hmelinin was the author. It was eventually published as The Malachite Box.

Bazhov was not certain of the authorship himself. He tried to avoid the question, joking that "questions such as these should be left to scholars". He admitted that he was writing the tales from memory, and could not possibly recall and write down all the details. Bazhov said he only remembered the main plot elements and some particularly memorable details. The author even claimed that his "reconstruction" eradicated from the stories any possible value for the folklorists. However this position was disputed by the scholars, such as Lyudmila Skorino, Alexander Barmin and others.

Nowadays Bazhov's tales are generally accepted as his own "literary work based on the Urals folklore" or call them "transitional" between folklore and fairy tales. There are several reasons for that. Firstly, although the plots of the folk tales remain unchanged, the book conveys certain ideological concepts common for that time period, while folklore normally has no philosophy. Secondly, the manuscripts demonstrate that a huge amount of professional work were done on the composition, imagery, and language. Bazhov had worked on some stories, such as "The Blue Snake", for years before publication. In some cases he created the storylines from scratch, e. g. with "Silver Hoof" he only heard about the mythical creature itself. Later studies showed that he used vague folkloric beliefs and molded then into an original mythology. When asked whether his early stories were closer to folklore sources, Bazhov agreed. As time went by, he became less depended on the folklore and more independent as a writer. The current consensus among the folklore specialists is that he used the fragments of legends and bound them together by his own creative imagination.

== Contents ==
The first edition of The Malachite Box was released on 28 January 1939. It consisted of an introduction titled "The Watchhouse on Dumna Mountain" and 14 stories, based on the oral lore of the miners and gold prospectors. After the initial publication, the author continuously added new stories to the collection, such as the so-called "mountain fairy tales" in 1942, Stories of Germans (Russian: Сказы о немцах, romanized: Skazy o nemtsakh) in 1943, a series of stories about Russian steel-makers and coiners in 1944–1945, Stories of Lenin (Russian: Сказы о Ленине, romanized: Skazy o Lenine) in 1944–1945, and others. Every edition of the collection ended with the dictionary of unusual words and concepts.

=== Introduction ===
"The Watchhouse on Dumna Mountain" (Russian: У караулки на Думной горе, romanized: U karaulki na Dumnoj gore) was Bazhov's essay which served as an introduction to the first edition of The Malachite Box. It contained some information about the life, industry and culture at the Urals. The first short version of the essay, included in the 1939 book, was titled "The Watchhouse on Dumna Mountain". In 1940 the author expanded it and renamed to "By the Old Mine" (Russian: У старого рудника, romanized: U starogo rudnika). This version was first published in the 3rd volume of the Uralsky Sovremennik almanac (1940). Starting with the 3rd edition of The Malachite Box, this essay was published in all subsequent editions. The author included the essay in every The Malachite Box edition for the purpose of familiarizing the reader with the unique culture of the Ural region.

=== Beloved Name ===
"Beloved Name" (alternative translation: That Dear Name) describes how the first Cossacks came to the Ural Mountains and were faced a tribe of the "Old People" who did not know the value of gold. The Cossacks decide to take away the lands of the Old People.

=== The Great Snake ===
In this skaz, the old miner's sons meet the Great Serpent (alternative translation: Poloz the Great Snake), the master of gold. He appears before them as a man in gold tunic. "His cap was yellow with red flaps on both sides, and his boots were gold too... The earth sank under him where he stood." He shows them how to find gold nuggets. The story of the brothers is continued in "The Snake Trail" (alternative translation: "The Serpent's Trail"), published in 1939.

=== The Mistress of the Copper Mountain ===
In this skaz, young factory worker Stepan meets the legendary Mistress of the Copper Mountain. He passes her tests and is rewarded by a malachite casket filled with jewellery for his betrothed, Nastyona.

=== The Malachite Casket ===
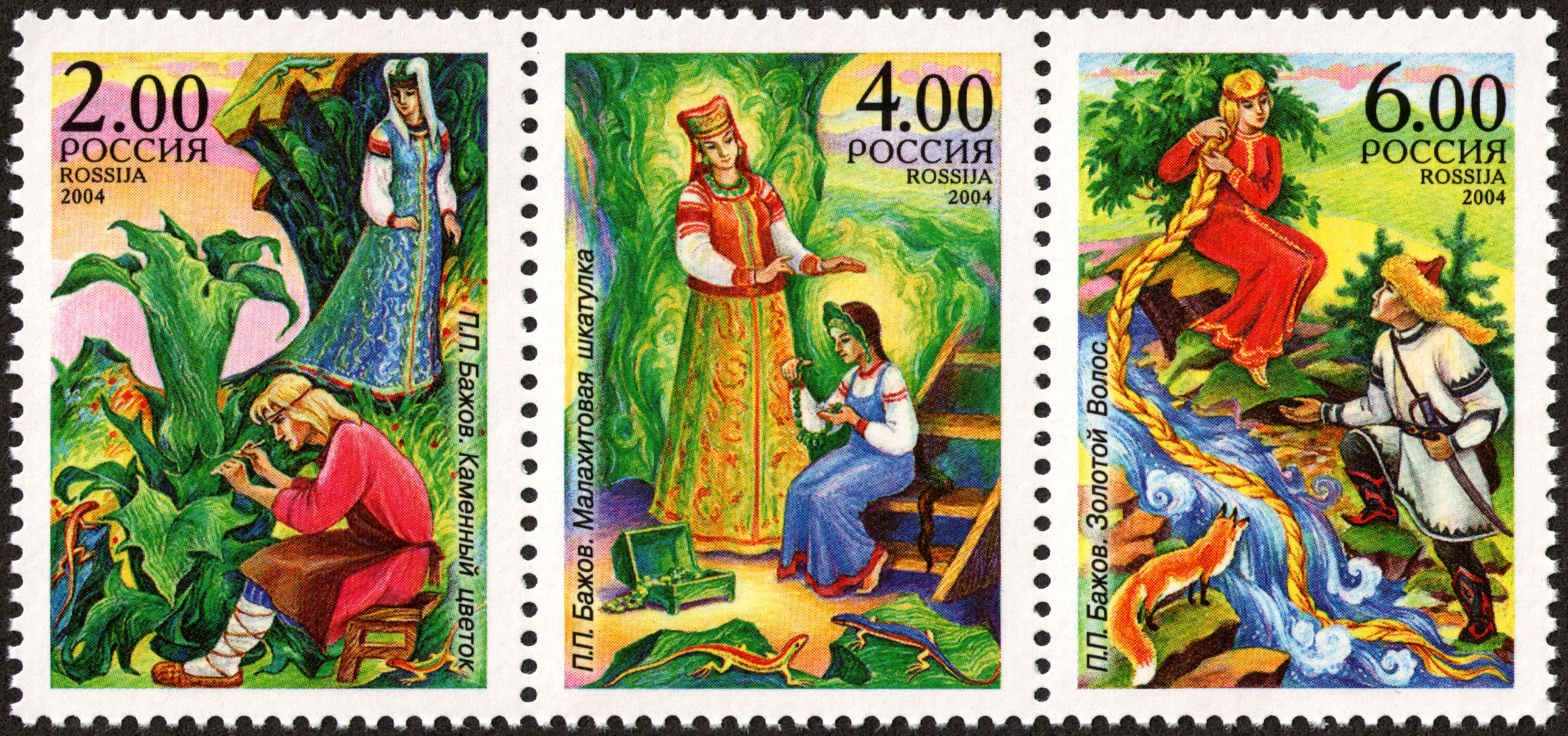
The stamps of Russia, 27 January 2004. The illustrations are (from left to right): "The Stone Flower" (Danilo and the Mistress of the Copper Mountain), "The Malachite Casket" (the Mistress and Tanyushka), "Golden Hair" (the hunter Ailyp and his ladylove Golden Hair).

Stepan dies, leaving the Malachite Casket to his widow Nastyona. Their daughter Tanyushka likes to play with it. With black hair and green eyes, Tanyushka does not look like her mother at all, as if she was born to different parents. When she grows up, she catches the eye of a young noble man. She promises to marry him if he shows her the Tsarina herself at the Malachite Room of the Palace.

=== The Stone Flower ===
Danilo the Craftsman hears about a most beautiful Stone Flower grows in the domain of the Mistress of the Copper Mountain. He goes to the mine and begs the Mistress to show him the Flower. The Mistress warns Danilo that he would never want to go back to his people, but he insists. She then shows him the Malachite Flower. Danilo disappears from the village, leaving his fiancée Katyenka behind.

Danilo's story continued in "The Master Craftsman" (alternative translations: "The Mountain Craftsman", "The Mountain Master"), published a year later in Na Smenu!. "A Fragile Twig", published in 1940, focuses on Katyenka and Danilo's son. Bazhov had plans for the fourth story, but it was never written.

=== Golden Hair ===
"Golden Hair" is based on the Bashkirs folklore. It tell the story of a Bashkir hunter Ailyp who meets the daughter of Poloz the Great Snake.

=== Other tales and later additions ===
In addition to the stories mentioned above, the first edition of The Malachite Box contained the following 8 stories: "The Manager's Boot-Soles", "Sochen and His Stones", "Marko's Hill", "The Twisted Roll", "The Two Lizards", "The Cat's Ears", "The Master Craftsman", and "The Snake Trail". The first publication's structure was determined by Bazhov. He preferred to start with the stories about gold and gold prospectors, because the believed this legends to be of more ancient origin. Later versions of The Malachite Box contained more than 40 stories.

== Mythology ==
Although the tales are based on folkloric tradition, many are somewhat different from their mythological and folkloric roots. Studies show that in many cases Pavel Bazhov used popular beliefs and molded them into his own original mythology. Bazhov said that his early tales, such as "Beloved Name", followed the oral tradition more closely than the later ones. He believed that the stories about the Gumyoshevsky mine were the closest to the original folklore. He said: "In my opinion, they represent the attempt to reconstruct the folklore of this mine". As time went by, Bazhov became less depended on the folklore and more independent as a writer. Some characters did not no exist at all in the original Ural folk tradition, although the author constructed them according to the mythological "canon".

Pavel Bazhov theorized that most of the existing mythical creatures were created by the populace to explain various unexplained natural phenomena, as they are related to some aspects of miners' life. Giving as example, the Earth Cat from "Cat's Ears" is described as "two blue flames that look like cat's ears" above the ground and represents sulfur dioxide gas. The antlered "goat" Silver Hoof from the story of the same name explained the occurrence of chrysolite: "... people often found stones in the glade where the goat had run about. Most of them were green ones, chrysolites, folks call them." The blue snake from the story of the same name represents a gold nugget. Although speaking about the blue snake was a bad omen among the local miners, to see one was a good sign, and it meant that a person would find a gold nugget. The crone Sinyushka from the tale "Sinyushka's Well" represents marsh gas, which was actually called "sinyushka" at the Urals. The author noted that supernatural played a bigger part in the miners' lore than in the lore of charcoal burners or blast furnace workers. Mining and mine exploration in particular were always connected with some supernatural forces which presumably helped the workers. Even as late as the 19th century, people used to say about the lucky workers that they "knew the words" and had certain helpers. The geography is well known because it is specified in the stories. Bazhov mentions real locations such as Sysert, the Polevskoy Copper Smelting Plant, the Gumyoshevsky mine, the villages Kosoy Brod and Krasnogorka, the Ryabinovka river.

Mythical creatures in The Malachite Box are either anthropomorphous (primarily female) or zoomorphic. The animals that appear in the stories and have zoomorphic attributes are lizards, snakes ("The Great Snake"), cranes ("Dikes of Gold"), ants ("Zhabrei's Path"), swans ("Yermak's Swans"), cats, the deer. All these creatures, with the exception of the cats, were depicted on the Permian bronze casts (the 5–15 centuries). Archaeologies had found the casts next to Mount Azov and along the Chusovaya River in Perm Krai, Sverdlovsk Oblast and Chelyabinsk Oblast of Russia. As for the cats, Alexei Ivanov noted that they are unlikely to come from the folk tales, and were probably added into the stories by the author. The anthropomorphous creatures are primarily female—Azovka from "Beloved Name", Golden Hair, the blue snake, the Mistress of the Copper Mountain, Poskakushka from "The Fire-Fairy", Sinyushka, Veselukha from "Veselukha's Meadow". They belong to different age groups: Poskakushka is a little girl, Golden Hair and the Mistress are maidens, Veselukha is a young woman, the blue snake is a woman, Sinyushka is an old woman. They mostly contact men, e.g. Poskakushka helps Fedyunka to find gold; the blue snake appears before boys; the Mistress traditionally helps single men only. Bazhov believed that miners missed women, because their work allowed for little contact with them, and therefore so many of their stories had female creatures.

The recurring characters that appear in folkloric tradition are the Mistress of the Copper Mountain and Poloz the Great Snake. Both of them are keepers of hidden underground riches. The Mistress, described as either a beautiful green-eyed woman in malachite gown or a lizard with the crown on her head, is the keeper of gemstones. Poloz is the master of every existing piece of gold. The miners believed that if a gold-bearing lode disappeared, it meant that the Great Snake moved it to a different place. Bazhov introduced numerous daughters of Poloz, including Golden Hair from the tale of the same name. The relationship between Poloz and the Mistress is unclear. Bazhov commented that he asked some story-tellers about it, but they could not answer the question. Bazhov believed that the Mistress was one of the latest characters to appear in legends, because of the complexity of the character. The origin of the characters such as those might also be Finno-Ugric. The Finno-Ugric peoples, who lived in that area, migrated to the Baltic Sea or assimilated into the new Russian culture, adding to it their folklore. Alexander Vernikov noted:

This lore included mining and metallurgic techniques unknown to Russians. [...] Finno-Ugrians’ beliefs and legends... featured the underground riches and powers, mostly moral and spiritual, impersonated in chthonic deities.

Poloz the Great Snake, the blue snake, Sinyushka, the Mistress of the Copper Mountain all act like magical helpers and present a threat to mortals at the same time. The help of such mythical creatures would explain why some miners were luckier than others. They were connected with mountains because of people's the perception of the mountains as "magical space"—the mountain was the source of life, it protected from hostile forces and was the residence of divine patrons. Yet the creatures such as Sinyushka and the blue snake do not hesitate to kill those who did not pass their tests. Even those who had been rewarded by them rarely live happily ever after. These characters usually die soon. Snakes live underground (according to the legends, in the underworld) and are traditionally associated with the Chthonic deities.

== Ideological influences ==
Many scholars highlighted the potently ideological nature of The Malachite Box, especially regarding the stories created at the end of the Great Patriotic War (1941–1945) and in the post-war years. Bazhov's work was supported by the Party. It was in high demand from the very beginning due to the shortage of the "workers' folklore", which should have represented the so-called class consciousness of the proletariat. The book conveys certain ideological concepts common for that time period, such as emphasis on the hard life of the working class before the Russian Revolution. Workers are depicted as the victims of class exploitation, while the mountain spirits are typically presented as magical helpers to the underprivileged. The mythical characters such as Poloz the Great Snake or the Mistress of the Copper Mountain act according to the principles of social justice, e. g. in "The Manager's Boot-Soles" it's said that the Mistress "didn't like it when folks were treated ill underground". Bazhov defines important values, such as love, family, masculinity, respect for the elders and workers, skill, sceptical attitude toward religion and clergy, diligence, camaraderie, harmony in the house and friendly relationship with neighbours, hospitality, modesty, honesty. An ideal man is a "simple soul", who is brave, patient, and hard-working. An ideal woman is beautiful, hard-working, loyal, thrifty, she takes care of household and children, gets on well with her husband. The plots often dramatize class conflicts. Some revolutionary propaganda is present in the dialogues. The narrator constantly refers to the fact that life before the Revolution was harder for working people. Mariya Litovskaya compared Pavel Bazhov to Mikhail Bulgakov, Andrei Platonov, and Dmitri Kedrin in such a way that the characters represent two concepts: the person who puts spiritual above the material, who looks for the truth, but loses a fight with nature in the end; and the new Soviet idea of protagonist as a professional who is ready for change and is capable of remaking the world. Foreigners are shown as uninspired people without creative spark, e.g. the German from "Ivanko Krylatko". In the stories penned during and after the Great Patriotic War, Bazhov wrote about great positive changes that happened in the life of the Ural workers after the October Revolution. A series of stories was devoted to the Russian communist leaders, Vladimir Lenin and Joseph Stalin.

Bazhov shared popular in the Soviet historiography anti-capitalist attitude. The owners of the Ural plants were depicted as worthless, idle, greedy and cruel. He criticized or parodied the Ural businessmen Alexei Turchaninov, Pavel Solomirsky and Dmitry Solomirsky.

Critics did not originally consider the texts suitable for children's reading because of their difficult multilayered language, but the ideological pressure caused them to be actively used for children's education at the Urals. Children were to "listen to the deeply rooted folk tales told by wise men and to follow the examples of the protagonists that these wise men presented". Mariya Litovskaya commented that the so-called "child-toned" stories were simplified and shortened so that even the unskilled reader could easily read each of them in one go. In such stories the children are the main characters and the mythical creatures do not threaten them, but instead help them, which compensated "for the inadequacy of the social and family help" and helped to create "favourable living conditions" for the children, therefore promoting a positive attitude in the young readers. The narrator often reminds the reader that even such magical help is no longer necessary, because the Soviet society has righted all the wrongs of a fairy-tale reality.

Tatiana Kruglova comments that there is a clear split of characters based on their social class: there are working men, most often depicted as positive characters, and their masters, shown critically or ironically. But in the pre-war stories the class criteria existed as the background only. The conflict between the characters came from the collision between poetic and pragmatical, grand and common, irrational and rational.

== Reception and legacy ==
The Malachite Box and its author became enormously popular. It was met with significant praise by critics and enthusiastically received by readers, including the general populace and the more sophisticated Soviet intelligentsia. Bazhov turned into one of the most famous writers in the Soviet Union. Strangers would greet him on the streets. The critics agreed that "never has the labour of miners, stone-cutters, teemers been celebrate in such a way, neither in verses, nor in prose", and that Bazhov managed to show the essence of the professional skill of the miners. Mikhail Batin complimented its uniqueness, and novelty in the contents and in the form. Favourable reviews on The Malachite Box appeared in Uralsky Rabochy (18 January 1939), Izvestia (4 April), Pravda and Industria Sotsialisma (July). However the critics disagreed on the question of authorship. Some considered The Malachite Box pure folklore, others thought of it was a literary work penned by Bazhov. The author himself tried to avoid the issue, joking that "questions such as these should be left to scholars". At present Bazhov's tales are generally accepted as his own literary work based on the Urals folklore.

The editor of Izvestia called The Malachite Box "a valuable contribution to the Soviet fiction" and noted that "the vividness of expression and poetic richness turn the wonderful stories of P. P. Bazhov into the truly artistic, poetic works of art". David Zaslavsky in Pravda called the book "remarkable", the imagery "sharp", and commented that the skazy are "excellent short stories that uncover the Urals history". Demyan Bedny wrote about it: "The richness of the skazy plots, the variety and beauty of their imagery are stunning. How many wonderful sources are there for woodcutters and artists, for drama, opera and ballet, not to mention cinema!" Marina Balina wrote that Bazhov had "managed to present the prerevolutionary Urals as a mythological world with mountain spirits and dark forces controlling the hidden riches". The stories, characters, style, the combination of fantasy and realism, and the language were praised. Bazhov was congratulated as a great storyteller, his stories were praised as having "huge ethic, aesthetic, and educational potential". Anna Karavayeva mentioned that "such books enrich not just our folklore, but the Soviet literature as a whole". Elena Givental wrote that the author "created the most poetic and identifiable set of Urals stories", which "has left a strong imprint in the minds of the Russian people". The article in Pravda as of 20 March 1943 stated that "Our [Soviet] people have fallen in love with the Ural's old storyteller P. Bazhov".

The flag of Polevskoy (from left to right): the Venus symbol (♀), which represents the chemical element copper and was the brand of the Polevskoy Copper Smelting Plant, the Mistress of the Copper Mountain depicted as the golden lizard, the symbolic representation of the Stone Flower from the story of the same name, and the eight-pointed star, the brand of the Seversky Pipe Plant.

Selected stories have been a part of school core curriculum since the Soviet Union, and are still used for education purposes nowadays. The Ministry of Education and Science of Russia included the tales in their 2013 list of 100 Recommended Books for schoolchildren. Their effective pedagogical influence have been noted. The Malachite Box became a classic of Soviet children's literature, yet the stories continued to be popular among adults as well. Mark Lipovetsky believed the situation in the author's life added to the depth of the tales and made them so popular among the adult readers. They were exceptionally popular during the Great Patriotic War. The paperbacks were sent to the front line. The author received fan mail from the soldiers who asked to send them the book. The publication attracted a large number of folklorists, who collected tales near Sysert since 1940s and long after Pavel Bazhov's death. The characters of the Ural Mountains folklore such as the Mistress of the Copper Mountain became very well known after their appearance in Bazhov's The Malachite Box. Sysert's old coat of arms (1982–2002) featured the Mistress as a lizard with a crown, as did Yekaterinburg's coat of arms from 1973 to 1991. The early design of Polevskoy's coat of arms (1981) had an image of the Stone Flower. The current version, as well as the flag of the town, features the Mistress depicted as the golden lizard. The Malachite Casket became the symbol of the Urals.

The Malachite Box is constantly republished, commented and illustrated. Not all stories are equally popular nowadays. The most popular tales were written between 1936 and 1939. Among the later stories, "A Fragile Twig" (1940), "The Fire-Fairy" (1940), "Tayutka's Mirror" (1941), "Ivanko Krylatko" (1943), "That Spark of Life" (1943) were popular. As for the skazy about Vladimir Lenin, such as "The Bogatyr's Glove" (1944) and "The Sunstone", they were called excessively didactic, and "remain known to avid Bazhov experts only". Some Bazhov's stories on the present day topics were unsuccessful even among his contemporaries. Mariya Litovskaya criticized the author for "yielding to social pressure" and adapting the folk tales of the Ural region for children.

=== Critical history ===
The tales have been a popular subject for analysis. During Soviet times, every edition of The Malachite Box had a foreword written by a famous writer or scholar, commenting on the creativity of the Ural miners, cruel landlords, social oppression and the "great workers unbroken by the centuries of slavery". The critics claimed that the author's purpose was to "glorify" the working class. Sergey Narovchatov in the 1979 article said that "the Ural worker in Bazhov's stories, who represents Russian proletariat, rises up in all his giant stature. It is mighty, talented, creatively gifted". After the dissolution of the Soviet Union, with the change of the public's ideology, the stories were regarded as Bazhov's way to run away from the "harsh reality of Soviet period". The scholars changed their focus to other issues, such as beauty and ugliness, life and death, order and chaos, eroticism, the relationship of people with nature and the Mountain, the mysterious in general, the place of the person in the world. Lidiya Slobozhaninova summarizes that some parts of The Malachite Box "become outdated, but others gain new meaning".

=== Adaptations ===
The stories from the collection inspired numerous adaptations, including films, radio and stage adaptations.

The Soviet poet Demyan Bedny was so impressed with the tales that he decided to adapt them into poetry. He began the work on 27 June 1939 and adapted the 14 original stories by 1 October 1939. He titled the manuscript Gornaya poroda (Russian: Горная порода, lit. "Rock"). Bedny made some changes to the length of some scenes, changed the character names, the endings, the dialogues, and the titles of several stories, e.g. "The Great Snake" was called "Brothers", "The Manager's Boot-Soles" was called "As Deserved". He started to prepare it for publication, but his plans were hindered when he saw Bazhov's new stories. Bedny was not happy with them and abandoned the book. It was published after his death in 1959, and is not well known now.

On 10 May 1939 the art committee under the Council of People's Commissars decided to organize a parade of all children's theatres, and Bazhov was asked to write a play based on The Malachite Box. They play was finished on 11 August and was performed at the Sverdlovsk Youth Theatre the same year. Following the success of the play, the Sverdlovsk Youth Theatre staged children's plays Yermak's Swans in 1942 and Silver Hoof in 1947, both written by the Soviet playwright Evgeny Permyak. The Moscow Puppet Theater staged a 1947 play Tales from the Urals (Russian: Сказы старого Урала, romanized: Skazy starogo Urala) by Klavdiya Filippova, based on "Sinyushka's Well" and "Golden Hair". Filippova then combined "The Great Snake" and "The Snake Trail" to create Poloz's Daughter (Russian: Полозова дочка, romanized: Polozova dochka) and "The Stone Flower" with "The Master Craftsman" to create the children's play The Stone Flower. All these plays were published in the 1949 collection Plays for Children's Theatre Based on Bazhov's Stories was published in Sverdlovsk. The storied that were considered difficult for a young reader were even more simplified as their stage adaptations, e.g. the sad ending of "Sinyushka's Well" was changed to a happy one, and Pavel Bazhov was not opposed to the changes.

In 1941 Alexander Fridlender composed the ballet The Mountain Fairy Tale (Russian: Горная сказка, romanized: Gornaja skazka), based on "The Mistress of the Copper Mountain". Based on "Marko's Hill", Klara Katsman created the operetta Mark Beregovik (Russian: Марк Береговик), which premiered in Sverdlovsk in 1955. Lyubov Nikolskaya composed the children's opera Silver Hoof based on the story of the same name in 1959. Vladimir Goryachikh composed the ballet The Living Stone (Russian: Живой камень, romanized: Zhivoj kamen) based on "Sinyushka's Well", which premiered in Nizhny Tagil in 1965. The 1973 opera The Fire Maid (based on "The Fire-Fairy") for schools was composed by Robert Long, with story adapted and lyrics by Dorothy Gulliver The 2012 opera The Malachite Casket, based on "The Mistress of the Copper Mountain" and "The Malachite Casket", was created by Dmitry Batin.

Two filmstrips were released, The Fire-Fairy (1956) and The Malachite Box (1972).

"The Stone Flower" was adapted for stage many times. The first ballet of the same name was created by Alexander Fridlender in 1944. The opera in four acts The Stone Flower by Kirill Molchanov premiered on 10 December 1950 in Moscow at the Stanislavski and Nemirovich-Danchenko Music Theatre. Sergey Severtsev wrote the Russian language libretto. It was the first opera of Molchanov. The role of Danila (tenor) was sung by Mechislav Shchavinsky, Larisa Adveyeva sung the Mistress of the Copper Mountain (mezzo-soprano), Dina Potapovskaya sung Katya (coloratura soprano).

The 1954 ballet The Tale of the Stone Flower was created by Sergei Prokofiev. Skazy, also called The Stone Flower, was the 1987 play of the Maly Theatre.

==== Music ====
A lot of Soviet and Russian composers drew inspiration from The Malachite Box. The suite Skazy was created by Grigory Frid in 1948. Alexey Muravlev based his symphonic poem Mount Azov (1949) on the tale "Beloved Name". In 1979 Margarita Kesareva created a series of piano pieces Ural Book (Уральская тетрадь), which included the movement "The Bear Stone" (Russian: Медведь-камень, romanized: Medved-kamen) inspired by "Yermak's Swans". In 2006 "Sinyushka's Well" was adapted into the musical for Russian folk instruments orchestra by Svetlana Nesterova.

==== Live action films ====
- The Winged Horses (Russian: Крылатые кони, romanized: Krylatye koni), a 1945 Soviet film based on "Ivanko Krylatko"
- The Stone Flower, a 1946 Soviet film; incorporates plot elements from the stories "The Mistress of the Copper Mountain" and "The Master Craftsman".
- Stepan's Remembrance, a 1976 Soviet film, the adaptation of "The Mistress of the Copper Mountain" and "The Malachite Casket".
- Sinyushka's Well, a 1978 Soviet film made on Sverdlovsk Film Studio for the 100th anniversary since the birth of Pavel Bazhov.
- The Stone Flower (another title: Skazy), a television film of two-episodes that premiered on 1 January 1988. This film is a photoplay (a theatrical play that has been filmed for showing as a film) based on the 1987 play of the Maly Theatre. It was directed by Vitaly Ivanov, with the music composed by Nikolai Karetnikov, and released by Studio Ekran. It starred Yevgeny Samoylov, Tatyana Lebedeva, Tatyana Pankova, Oleg Kutsenko.
- The Secret Power (Russian: Тайная сила, romanized: Tainaya sila), a 2001 Russian film
- The Golden Snake, a 2007 Russian film is loosely based on "The Great Snake".
- The Book of Masters, a 2009 Russian language fantasy film, is loosely based on Bazhov's tales, mostly "The Mistress of the Copper Mountain" and "The Stone Flower".

A docufiction feature film Tales of the Ural Mountains (Russian: Сказы уральских гор, romanized: Skazy uralskikh gor), released by Sverdlovsk Film Studio in 1968, combined information about Bazhov's works with acted scenes from "The Mistress of the Copper Mountain", "The Stone Flower", "The Master Craftsman", "The Fire-Fairy", "The Twisted Roll", "That Spark of Life".

==== Animation ====
The animated film series based on the stories from The Malachite Box was made at Sverdlovsk Film Studio from the early 1970s to early 1980s, on time for the 100th anniversary since the birth of Pavel Bazhov. The series included the following films: Sinyushka's Well (1973), The Mistress of the Copper Mountain (1975), The Malachite Casket (1976), The Stone Flower (1977), Podaryonka (based on "Silver Hoof", 1978), Golden Hair (1979), and The Grass Hideaway (1982).

Three hand-drawn animated films were released by Soyuzmultfilm in the 1970s: Silver Hoof in 1977 directed by Gennady Sokolsky and written by Genrikh Sapgir, The Master Craftsman in 1978 directed by Inessa Kovalevskaya, was based on "The Stone Flower" and "The Master Craftsman"; The Fire-Fairy in 1979 directed by Natalia Golovanova.
