= That Spark of Life =

- Short story by Pavel Bazhov
- Original title: Живинка в деле
- Translator: Eve Manning
- Country: Soviet Union
- Language: Russian
- Genre: skaz

Publication
- Published in: Krasny Borets
- Publication type: Periodical
- Media type: Print (newspaper, hardback and paperback)
- Publication date: 17 October 1943
- Series: The Malachite Casket collection (list of stories)

"That Spark of Life" (Russian: Живинка в деле, romanized: Zhivinka v dele) is a short story (skaz) written by Pavel Bazhov. It was first published in Krasny Borets in October, 1943. It was later included in The Malachite Casket collection. In the 1950s it was translated from Russian into English by Eve Manning

This is one of the most popular stories of the collection. It generated a Russian catchphrase "spark of life" meaning "creativity", "initiative", or "great interest in something".

A docufiction feature film Tales of the Ural Mountains (Russian: Сказы уральских гор, romanized: Skazy uralskikh gor), released by Sverdlovsk Film Studio in 1968, included a live-action adaptation of "That Spark of Life".

== Publication ==
It was first published in Krasny Borets on 17 October and in Uralsky Rabochy on 27 October 1943.

"That Spark of Life" was published in mainstream media with an assistance of the Soviet poet Demyan Bedny. In his letter as of 2 November 1943 to the Ural historian Andrian Pyankov, who had sent him the story, Bedny wrote:

You made me very happy by sending Bazhov's tale "That Spark of Life". It is indeed a small masterpiece, a charming little thing! Yesterday I draw the attention of Pravda's editorial staff to it. If Pravda doesn't publish it, it's only because they are desperately crammed. But it will probably be published in Trud. It's more suitable for Trud. I've been itching to write a foreword to it, but—I'm "crammed" as well. But I will try. The story is way too good in form and thought.

The story was eventually published in both Pravda and Trud on 21 November 1943. It was later released as a part of The Malachite Box collection in 1944.

== Plot ==
The main character of the story, Timokha Maloruchko (lit. "Smallhand"), quickly grasps everything that he tries and is good at everything. He decides to try every single local craft. Others try to dissuade him, explaining that no life is long enough and it's better to excel in one craft rather than be Jack of all trades, master of none, but Timokha is adamant. He creates a timetable for himself: two winters to learn logging, two springs for timber rafting, two summers for gold prospecting, a year for mining, ten years for factory work, then farming, hunting, fishing, gem cutting and so on. People laugh at him, but everything goes well, because Timokha is hard-working and smart. He gradually works his way through various professions, marries, has children. One day he decides to try the charcoal burning, although his wife claims that it is dirty work and there's nothing to learn in it.

Timokha finds a teacher, the old master Nefyod, who is known for making the best charcoal in the area. Nefyod is very passionate about his profession. He agrees to take an apprentice, but he says that he will teach Timokha all he knowns and hold nothing back on one condition—Timokha will not leave until he can make better charcoal than Nefyod. Timokha agrees to the terms. He watches and learns, and eventually grows fond of both Nefyod and the job. Timokha learns how to make the best charcoal, but, to his own surprise, does not want to leave. Nefyod says:

You'll never go anywhere else now, lad. You're caught wi' the spark of life, and it'll keep ye till your death. [...] You always looked down, looked at what ye'd done; but when you started to look up, to look for ways to do it all better, then that spark caught ye. It's there in every sort of work, it runs ahead of skilled mastery and beckons a man after it.

Timokha continues to work in the charcoal burning and after Nefyod's death becomes the best charcoal master.

== Sources ==
The charcoal burning was considered a complicated chemical process, many aspects of which were unclear to regular workers. Some believed that mythical creatures were involved, e.g. Zhivinka helped, while Pustodymka (lit. "empty smoke") or "Ognevka" (lit. "fire girl") interfered with the process. However the author noted that the supernatural played a bigger part in the miners' lore than in the lore of charcoal burners or blast furnace workers.

Valentin Blazhes noted that "That Spark of Life" described the situation similar to the one mention in the article published in the Perm Governorate newspaper after the end of serfdom. There was a custom at the Seversky Pipe Plant of making the workers change their duties very often. For example, a person who worked with an axe "today", "was sent to the iron-smelting plant tomorrow", and so on. Thus, a workman during all his life tried everything and excelled in nothing. It was easier and more profitable for the owners because the under-qualified workers were also underpaid.

== Themes ==
"That Spark of Life" is one of the stories published during the Great Patriotic War (1941–1945), when the author switched from supernatural stories based on mythology to realistic and patriotic tales. Bazhov considered it his duty as the patriot.

By "spark" Bazhov meant the creative spark. Bazhov respected skill, hard work, and thirst for knowledge. He believed those were the qualities of the Ural populace. Bazhov noted that he has never seen such cult of craftsmanship, diligence, skill as at the Urals. The topic of masterful craftsmen was one of his favourites. Most of his tales were dedicated to the topic of skills, creativity, and virtues of the Ural miners. Bazhov believed that a person can become an expert even when employed in the dirtiest and the most underpaid work. Lidiya Slobozhaninova noted that Bazhov tried to avoid exaggerated dramatism even when writing about such topics as the aspiration for work as a natural quality of human nature. Slobozhaninova commented that Bazhov describes Timokha Maloruchko not with pathos, but with good-natured humour.

The teacher who passes on his secrets is always a special character in Bazhov's stories. The teacher, as the author sees it, should not be blindly followed or copied. He should be someone who can inspire creatively, such as the old master Nefyod. Before meeting him, Timokha tried his hand at everything, but his knowledge was superficial and amateurish, i.e. not a true mastery. Nefyod teaches Timokha to look for the "spark" in his work. Bazhov believed that every craftsman should be an artist at heart. Similar themes appear in the story "Ivanko Krylatko".
