= Beloved Name =

- Short story by Pavel Bazhov
- Original title: Дорогое имячко
- Translator: Alan Moray Williams (first), Eve Manning, et al.
- Country: Soviet Union
- Language: Russian
- Genre: skaz

Publication
- Published in: Krasnaya Nov
- Publication type: Periodical
- Media type: Print (magazine, hardback and paperback)
- Publication date: 1936
- Published in English: 1944

Chronology
- Series: The Malachite Casket collection (list of stories)
—	The Great Snake

"Beloved Name" or "That Dear Name" (Russian: Дорогое имячко, romanized: Dorogoe imjachko, lit. "The Dear Name") is a folk tale (the so-called skaz) of the Ural region of Siberia collected and reworked by Pavel Bazhov. It was first published in the 11th issue of the Krasnaya Nov literary magazine in 1936 and later the same year as a part of the collection Prerevolutionary Folklore of the Urals. It was later released as a part of the collection of tales, The Malachite Casket. This skaz describes how the first Cossacks came to the Ural Mountains and were faced a tribe of the "Old People" who didn't know the value of gold. The Cossacks decide to take away the lands of the Old People. The tale features the female creature from the Ural folklore called the Azov Girl (Russian: Азовка, romanized: Azovka). The story was translated from Russian into English by Alan Moray Williams in 1944, and by Eve Manning in the 1950s.

Alexey Muravlev based his symphonic poem Mount Azov (1949) on the tale.

The tale is told from the point of view of the imaginary Grandpa Slyshko (Russian: Дед Слышко, romanized: Ded Slyshko; lit. "Old Man Listenhere").

== Publication ==
This skaz was first published together with "The Mistress of the Copper Mountain" and "The Great Snake" (also known as "The Great Serpent") in the 11th issue of Krasnaya Nov in 1936. "Beloved Name" was published on the pages 5–9, "The Great Snake" on pp. 9–12, and "The Mistress of the Copper Mountain" on pp. 12–17. These tales are the ones that follow the original Ural miners' folklore most closely. They were included in the collection Prerevolutionary Folklore of the Urals (Russian: Дореволюционный фольклор на Урале, romanized: Dorevoljucionnyj folklor na Urale), released later the same year by Sverdlovsk Publishing House. It was later released as a part of The Malachite Casket collection on 28 January 1939.

In 1944 the story was translated from Russian into English by Alan Moray Williams and published by Hutchinson as a part of The Malachite Casket: Tales from the Urals collection. The title was translated as "Beloved Name". In the 1950s another translation of The Malachite Casket was made by Eve Manning The story was published as "That Dear Name".

== Plot ==
The Old People live in the mountains, but they do not realize the value of gold. Their children use gemstones to play with, the hunters kill animals with gold nuggets during hunting. They mine some copper to make axes and cooking tools, but other than that they live on hunting, beekeeping, fishing.

They weren't Russians and they weren't Tatars, but how they were named and what was their faith and belief no one knows. They lived there in the forest. They were the Old People. They hadn't any houses or outbuildings like bath-house or shed, none of that at all, and they didn't live in a village. They lived in the hills.

One day Yermak Timofeyevich, on his conquest of Siberia, comes to the area. The Cossacks bring weapons and scare away the Old People, who hide in the cave inside Mount Azov. The Cossacks act like bandits, drink and start fights all the time. They decide to take away the lands and the gold of the Old People. One of the Cossacks tries to stop them, but gets wounded in the process. He goes to Mount Azov to warn the Old People. The elder's daughter, a beautiful girl of gigantic height, attempts to nurse him back to health. The Cossack stays in the cave, eats local food, learns the language and takes liking to the girl, but he does not feel any better.

He recommends the Old People to bury their gold in the ground, collect all the gemstones and hide them inside Mount Azov. They begin gathering the nuggets and the gemstone and carrying them into Mount Azov, while the others are keeping guard on Dumnaya. Unfortunately the rumours about gold spreads, more and more Cossack bands came. The Old People come to the wounded Cossack for advice. He lies dying on top of Dumnaya, with the girl nearby. "There they took counsel for three days". Eventually the Old People decide to leave the area, offering to take the Cossack with them, but he refuses and explains that he can feel death approaching. The girl, who fell in love with him, stays too. The man says:

A time will come in our land where there will be no more merchants or Tsar, and even their names will be forgotten. Folks hereabouts will grow tall and strong, and one of these will [...] loudly call your dear name. When that day comes, bury me in the ground and go to him with a brave gay heart. For he will be your mate. And when that day comes, let them take all the gold, if indeed those folks have use for it.

Then he dies and in that moment Mount Azov "closes", trapping the girl inside. In the end of the skaz it is said that the Cossack's body still lies in the cave with the treasures and the beautiful girl, who always cries and never ages. Those who try to enter the cave or guess the girl's name, fail.

== Sources ==
=== The Old People ===
The tale is believed to be of Finno-Ugric origin. The Old People are probably the aborigines of the Urals, i.e. the Finno-Ugric peoples that lived in that area. When Russians came, they migrated to the Baltic Sea or assimilated into the new culture, adding to it their folklore.

Alexander Vernikov notes:

Finno-Ugric "ancient" people, according to Bazhov, knew neither avarice nor bellicosity of their successors in the Urals. Take, for example, The Kalevala, the acme of Finnish epic poetry: the world literature knows no other epic whose heroes do not wage war against others and who are not extolled as "traditional" warriors.

The belief of the Old People was very popular among the Ural populace. They were believed to be the giants capable great feats of strength, who lived on hunting and fishing.

=== Azovka ===
The skaz features the female creature from the local folktales called Azovka or Devka Azovka (lit. "the Azov girl"), named after Mount Azov. In folk mythology of the Ural Mountains of Russia, she is the girl who lives inside Mount Azov. Folklorists collected more than 20 tales about her. This character is one of the few still remembered in the region.

Although the actual folktales about Azovka are very different from one another, they share some common characteristics, such as a cave with hidden treasures. The cave is inside Mount Azov, few people found it, and no one could get the treasures, which belong to the Tatars, the Bashkirs, or "the Old People". The most common interpretation is that Azovka is the enchanted girl, possibly stolen by the Tatars, or the cursed Tatar princess. She lives inside the cave (or the mountain) and constantly moans. According to popular belief, she was left with or forced to guard some treasures.

Valentin Blazhes gives some examples of the stories. The one that was collected at the Mramorsky village is as follows:

Every time people went to Azov-mountain, they always heard the moaning. They say that a cursed queen lives there. She lives in the cave. If someone approaches here, she will come out. She has a name. If her name will be the same as the name of the person who found the cave, there will be no more moaning—the curse be lifted.

One tale says that this girl ran away from the landlord, who wished to marry her, and decided to hide in the cave. Yet another tale says that she was left by "the Old People" to guard their treasures. She was also viewed as either their queen or the elder's daughter. In some stories, a spirit lives in the mountain with her and it scares all people away. People were afraid to come close to Mount Azov and even ride next to it, because they believed that Azovka can enchant a person so that he gets lost. In many folktales, the Mistress of the Copper Mountain and Azovka are identical with each other. The Mistress might have appeared as a successor of Azovka, because she was most famous in the same areas as Azovka before her.
