= The Great Snake =

- Short story by Pavel Bazhov
- Original title: Про Великого Полоза
- Translator: Alan Moray Williams (first), Eve Manning, et al.
- Country: Soviet Union
- Language: Russian
- Genre: skaz

Publication
- Published in: Krasnaya Nov
- Publication type: Periodical
- Media type: Print (magazine, hardback and paperback)
- Publication date: 1936
- Published in English: 1944

Chronology
- Series: The Malachite Casket collection (list of stories)
Beloved Name	The Mistress of the Copper Mountain

"The Great Snake" or "The Great Serpent" (Russian: Про Великого Полоза, romanized: Pro Velikogo Poloza, lit. "Of the Great Serpent" (Note: Lipovetsky spells as "polaza" and appends English meaning as "Of the great serpent".)) is a folk tale (the so-called skaz) of the Ural region of Siberia collected and reworked by Pavel Bazhov. It was first published in the 11th issue of the Krasnaya Nov literary magazine in 1936 and later the same year as a part of the collection Prerevolutionary Folklore of the Urals. It was later released as a part of The Malachite Casket collection. The story was translated from Russian into English by Alan Moray Williams in 1944, and by Eve Manning in the 1950s.

In this skaz, two boys meet the legendary Great Snake (also translated as Poloz the Great Snake; Великий Полоз; Velikij Poloz).

The story of the two brothers is continued in "The Snake Trail", published in 1939.

== Publication ==
This skaz was first published together with "The Mistress of the Copper Mountain" and "Beloved Name" (also known as "That Dear Name") in the 11th issue of Krasnaya Nov in 1936. "Beloved Name" was published on the pages 5–9, "The Great Snake" on pp. 9–12, and "The Mistress of the Copper Mountain" on pp. 12–17. These tales are the ones that follow the original Ural miners' folklore most closely, (Note: cf. Ural miners "explained mysterious natural phenomena", see quote below for specifics.)

They were included in the collection Prerevolutionary Folklore of the Urals (Дореволюционный фольклор на Урале; Dorevolyutsionnyy fol'klor na Urale), released later the same year by Sverdlovsk Publishing House. It was later released as a part of The Malachite Casket collection on 28 January 1939.

In 1944 the story was translated from Russian into English by Alan Moray Williams and published by Hutchinson as a part of The Malachite Casket: Tales from the Urals collection. The title was translated as "The Great Snake". In the 1950s another translation of The Malachite Casket was made by Eve Manning. The story was published as "The Great Serpent".

The story is the first in a cycle of prospectors' tales, followed by "The Snake Trail" (1939), "The Fire-Fairy" (Ognevushka-Poskakushka, 1940), "Zhabrei's Path" (1942), "Dikes of Gold" (Золотые дайки, 1945) and "The Blue Snake" (1945).

== Plot ==
The old miner Levonty is considered worn out after years of mining for copper, and the manager (prikazchik, also translated "bailiff") transfers him to the gold mine. To no avail. With the master's auspices, he is released from the obligation of paying obrók (a serf's levee, translated "quit-rent"). Now a freedman, he takes up prospecting for gold. He has his two sons tag along. The usually secretive prospectors (Note: They pity the man, who was thought not to last long.) provide good tips on prospecting spots. So he registers to explore the prolific Ryabinovka (Рябиновка) river.

After a week of paltry gold harvest, the father tells the boys to stay at the shed to guard the tools. They feed on fish they from the Chusovaya river nearby. They meet Semyonich, formerly a local iron furnace operator from long ago. He had book smarts and seemed to procure money out of nowhere. A strange man, he refused those who sought his help, but generously helped the needy who didn't ask. The children share their fish soup meal, and the man offers bread. After hearing their dire situation, he promises to consult someone for help, but warns to keep it secret, and never to show fear when the help arrives. Later, Semyonich returns with a green-eyed man:

He was [dressed] all yellow, his tunic (kaftan) and trousers were of gold, that brocade the priests wear, and [around his kaftan] his wide girdle with a pattern and tassels hanging, from it was brocade too, only it shone greenish. His [shapka hat] was yellow with red flaps on both sides, and his boots were red too. [...] And his eyes were green,[...] The earth sank under him where he stood.

The helper hints that he is the Great Snake who could reveal the trail to gold, but worries he may spoil the boys with the secret. Semyonich defends the boys as being un-pampered and destitute. The snake-man philosophizes that:

All men are shoes from the same last (колодка). As long as they're poor and in need, they're decent folk, but let them come upon my golden trail, and evil grows up in them like toadstools, and whence come the spores none can say". (Note: The latter part "like toadstools.. spores" is the translator Manning's embellishment. The Russian original more plainly states: "как за мое охвостье поймаются, так откуда только на их всякой погани налипнет (when ensnared by my tail, all sorts of filth cling to them)".)

The Great Poloz is willing to take a chance on the children's innocence, but their father, though soon to die, is still corruptible, and will not be trusted with the secret of the gold loot. The man then transforms into the Great Snake (alternative translation: The Great Serpent) rearing out of the ground, tall as a tree, and crawling to the Ryabinovka (a river according to the author), grew longer, as more and more "rings" or segments appeared from the earth. Their campfire got extinguished, but there came a mysterious bright illumination, unlike sunlight and cold. The snake caused the river to freeze and went to the other bank, and at an old birch (берёза) tree standing, said that was the marker for the place to dig.

Semyonich then lectures about the Great Snake Poloz, that when prospectors fight over the gold, or if the government office in the name of the monarchy confiscates a good spot, Poloz will angrily cause the contended gold vein to disappear. The boys swear themselves to secrecy and never to be greedy. Instead of going to the original marked birch, they decide to dig elsewhere, and find a new birch had grown from their campfire ashes. Here they dig and find two gold nuggets. Things were going well for the boys for the time being. "Well, then they turned crazy, of course. But that's another story", warns the tale at the end. (Note: "Ну, потом свихнулось, конечно. Только это уж другой сказ будет, translated by Manning as "Of course it took a bad turn later".) The aftermath is told in the sequel, "The Snake Trail" (or "The Serpent's Trail").

== Veliky Poloz ==
As for the Great Snake Veliky Poloz, (Великий Полоз; Velikiy Poloz), Bazhov explains that in Ural miners' myth:

The snakes were ruled by a huge snake, Poloz. All the gold was at his disposal. Poloz could "take away" and "bring" gold at his will. Sometimes with help from his snake servants, sometimes using only his own powers. Sometimes Poloz's role was limited to guarding the "land gold". Poloz resorted to all sorts of ways trying to prevent people from developing lands that had gold reserves: he "scared" them by showing himself "in his full form", "caused all sorts of anxiety for the prospector" by dragging his tool into the ground, or, finally, "took away" the gold.

In rare cases, Poloz could be more discerning, and act as a "conscientious, sovereign steward" (Note: "сознательного, полновластного распоряди́тель") of his gold, meting out rewards of gold or punishments of scaring-off/death, as he saw fit.

Bazhov also introduced numerous daughters of the Snake,including Zmeevka (Змеевка), Ognevushka (Огневушка), and Golden Hair (Золотой волос; Zolotoy volos), who becomes the stolen bride of the Bashkir hero Ailyp (Айлып) in the tale "Golden Hair".

The relationship between him and another folklore creature, The Mistress of the Copper Mountain, is unclear, and Bazhov was not able to get his best storytelling source (Grandpa Slyshko) to clarify on this point. (Note: Russian: "Взаимоотношения между Полозом и Хозяйкой горы были не.. Он хоть кто ей-то? Муж? Отец?" (The relationship between the Snake and the Mistress of the Mountain was not completely clear.. Who is he to her? Husband? Father?)", etc.)

== Origins ==
Poloz (Russian: полоз, IPA: [ˈpoləs]; is the word for the snakes from the Colubridae family.

Bazhov himself professed "the origin of the image of Poloz [...] somehow did not interest me at all", as they were images "familiar from childhood". He did not think they derived from "ancient symbolism or moralizing dialogue (Note: It is unclear what "морализаторских разговоров" or "moralizing dialogue" signifies, but as for moral tales these were found illustrated in lubok.) but external surrounding impressions". (Note: "Происхождение образа Полоза — змея-хранителя золота..") That is to say, people were probably familiarly witness to large "Snake" since the aboriginal population (jalpyng uj; ялпын уй).

The character of Poloz the Great Snake is based the Ural legends, miner's omens, and on the superstitions of the Khanty, the Mansi people, and the Bashkirs. The legends about Poloz, a giant serpent 6–10 meters long, still exist in the Urals. In Bashkir folklore the Master of Gold can appear in the form of various animals, including the snake. Throughout the Urals, the hoarder of gold is called The Serpent or The Snake King (Змеиный царь, Zmeinyj tsar). (Note: "Везде хранитель и хозяин золота змей, змеиный царь (Everywhere the keeper and master of gold is the snake, the snake king)".) And although Bazhov professed ignorance about the north, "in the Middle and Southern Urals this fantastic snake is more often called Poloz, the Great Poloz (Velikiy Poloz)". (Note: "но по Среднему и Южному этого фантастического змея чаще зовут Полозом , Великим Полозом".)

It is believed that the grass turns yellow where he touches the surface. Poloz and the snake trails in general indicate the location of gold. The legless lizard species of slowworms are also his servants.

Geographically, the folk tales came from the old Sysert Mining District, which included five mining plants, i. e. the Sysert Plant (Sysertsky Zavod), the head plant of the district, Polevskoy Plant (also known as Polevaya or Poleva), Seversky, Verkhny (Verkh-Sysertsky), and Ilyinsky (Nizhve-Sysertsky). The appearances of Poloz were often connected with the Polevskoy plant.

Bazhov believed that the most ancient creature of the Ural mythology is Azov Girl, the Snake appeared next, and the last one was the Mistress. It is further proved by the fact that Poloz is a zoomorphic being, as he probably comes from the era of totemistic beliefs.

In the story cycle of the snakes, the Ural miners "explained mysterious natural phenomena" in terms of the Great Poloz and his daughter serpents. According to Bashov, if "a gold-bearing vein was lost—this means that Poloz (a huge snake—the owner of all gold in the earth)—took this vein to another place ... Gold inside such a dense stone as quartz was explained by the fact that Poloz's daughter Zmeevka passed here, etc.". (Note: "Например, потерялась золотоносная жила - это значит, что Полоз (огромный змей - хозяин всего зелота в земле)- отвел эту жилу в другое место... Золото внутри такого плотного камня, как кварц, объяснялось тем, что здесь прошла Полозова дочь-Змеевка, и т. д.".)

== Critical analysis ==
Bazhov's Poloz, in addition to his traditional function of a treasure guardian, also fulfils the concept of social justice. He rewards the worthy and is dangerous to everyone else, especially to those who starts quarrels because of gold. His gifts are not supposed to be shared.

In Bazhov's tales, his constant opponent is the wise eagle-owl.

Semyonich is a classical Bazhov's character. On the one hand, he is a seeker (Note: Russian: искатель) who is in contact with magical beings, on the other hand, he is an outsider, (Note: Russian: аутсайдер) who is not accepted in the society.

Denis Zherdev compared Poloz and the Mistress of the Copper Mountain, pointing out the male domain of Poloz is the world of order, structure, and hierarchy, and the power over gold is associated with the power of men. Unlike the Mistress, his appearance does not bring in unpredictability and destruction.

== Adaptations ==
The Soviet playwright Klavdiya Filippova combined "The Great Snake" and "The Snake Trail" to create Poloz's Daughter (Полозова дочка: Polozova dochka). The play was published in the 1949 collection Plays for Children's Theatre Based on Bazhov's Stories in Sverdlovsk.

A 2007 Russian film The Golden Snake (Золотой полоз: Zolotoy poloz) is loosely based on "The Great Snake".
