= The Fire-Fairy =

- Short story by Pavel Bazhov
- Original title: Огневушка-поскакушка
- Translator: Alan Moray Williams (first), Eve Manning, et al.
- Country: Soviet Union
- Language: Russian
- Genre: skaz (fairy tale)

Publication
- Published in: Morozko
- Publication type: anthology
- Publisher: Sverdlovsk Publishing House
- Media type: print
- Publication date: 1940
- Published in English: 1944
- Series: The Malachite Casket collection (list of stories)

"The Fire-Fairy" or "The Dancing Fire Maid" (Russian: Огневушка-поскакушка, romanized: Ognevushka-poskakushka, lit. "the hopping fire girl") is a fairy tale short story written by Pavel Bazhov, based on the folklore of the Ural region of Siberia. It was first published in 1940 in the children's stories collection Morozko released by Sverdlovsk Publishing House. It was later included in The Malachite Casket collection. In this fairy tale, the characters meet the female creature from the Ural folklore called Poskakushka (lit. "the jumping/hopping girl"), who can do the magical dance that reveals gold deposits. This is one of the most popular stories of the collection. It was translated from Russian into English by Alan Moray Williams in 1944, and by Eve Manning in the 1950s.

Pavel Bazhov indicated that all his stories can be divided into two groups based on tone: "child-toned" (e.g. "Silver Hoof") and "adult-toned" (e.g. "The Stone Flower"). He called "The Fire-Fairy" a "child-toned" story. Such stories have simple plots, children are the main characters, and the mythical creatures help them, typically leading the story to a happy ending.

== Publication ==
In 1939 Klavdiya Rozhdestvenskaya, the editor-in-chief of Sverdlovsk Publishing House was working on the children's book Morozko. She decided to include Bazhov's fairy tale "Silver Hoof" in it, which had previously been published in Uralsky Sovremennik, and said to Bazhov that she needed another story or two. Bazhov replied that he had an idea about the character Poskakushka, but he needed to go back to the factory and "relive old memories" by talking to some story-tellers. After a short trip to Polevskoy Bazhov completed "The Fire-Fairy". The fairy tale was published in Morozko and became a popular children's story.

In 1944 the story was translated from Russian into English by Alan Moray Williams and published by Hutchinson as a part of The Malachite Casket: Tales from the Urals collection. The title was translated as "The Fire-Fairy". In the 1950s another translation of The Malachite Casket was made by Eve Manning The story was published as "The Dancing Fire Maid". It was included in James Riordan's collection of stories The Mistress of the Copper Mountain: Tales from the Urals, published in 1974 by Frederick Muller Ltd. Riordan heard the tales from a headteacher when he was bedridden in Sverdlovsk. After returning to England he rewrote the tales from memory, checking them against Bazhov's book. He preferred not to call himself "translator", he believed that "communicator" was more appropriate.

== Sources ==
Bazhov's stories are based on the oral lore of the miners and gold prospectors. In their stories, Poskakushka is a dancing girl who shows the location of gold. The help of such mythical creature would explain why some miners were luckier than others, and unexplained natural phenomena such as the location of gold. She is sometimes called the daughter of Poloz the Great Snake from "The Great Snake".

The folklorists believed that the character is connected with the river Poskakukha next to the Polevskoy Copper Smelting Plant in the old Sysert Mining District. The name of the river Poskakukha and its affectionate diminutive form Poskakushka literally mean "the jumping (hopping) girl". The gold prospectors say that the gold placement is unusual there: "there is gold in some places, but there is nothing right next to it". The pits are placed so that they look like miners decided to "jump over" some spots, and that is how the "hopping girl" appeared. There was also the Poskakushkinsky mine. To reach it, one "should jump over the marshes". Nataliya Shvabauer believed that this character did not no exist in the original Ural folk tradition, although the author constructed it according to the "mythological canon". This canon is believed to be pagan. The Fire-Fairy (alternative translation: the Dancing Fire Maid) and its magical dance that reveals gold deposits could be based on the Mansi goddess Sorni-Nai (she was called the Golden Woman in Russian). Her name can be literally translated from Vogul as "Gold-Fire". Alexei Ivanov commented that the Dancing Fire Maid's pagan origin "cannot be denied", as evident from her connection between gold and fire and her dancing in a circle, as in pagan khorovods. For other Finno-Ugric peoples, gold was also associated with fire.

The 1968 docufiction feature film Tales of the Ural Mountains (Russian: Сказы уральских гор, romanized: Skazy uralskikh gor) claimed that Bazhov had heard about the Poskakushkinsky mine, and created the character from scratch. For him "hopping" had sounded magical and had been associated with fire, and that is how the Fire-Fairy appeared. However, according to the data collected in folklorist expeditions, Poskakushka did exist in local folklore.

== Plot ==
A group of gold prospectors, including an old man Yefim (alternative translation: Grandpa Efim) and an 8-year-old boy Fedyunka, called "Tyunka" by his father, sit around a fire in the woods. A tiny girl suddenly jumps out of the fire.

... just like a doll, she was, but alive. Her hair was red, her sarafan blue, and she held a blue kerchief in her hand. She looked around them merrily and her teeth shone white. Then she put one hand on her hip, raised the blue kerchief with the other and began to dance.

She finishes her dance and disappears, while the prospectors look as if spellbound and almost forget the experience afterwards. The only person who clearly remember the maid is Fedyunka. He also hears the cry of an eagle-owl as if the bird is laughing at him. Yefim explains that the girl was the Fire-Fairy, a sign of gold: "If the dancer shows herself, there's gold in that place". Next morning the prospectors start digging in the area, but cannot seem to remember the exact place where the maid had danced. Fedyunka blames the owl, but no one believes him. Children at the factory give him a nickname "Dancing Tyunka" (Russian: Тюнька Поскакушка, romanized: Tjunka Poskakushka). The only person who doesn't laugh at him is Yefim. They become close friends. One day they see the Fire-Fairy again, and again the eagle-owl scares her away. Fedyunka is convinced that the Fairy would have shown them the way to gold if the owl had not hooted.

In the winter Fedyunka's father leaves to work in the mine, and the boy stays with his evil step-mother. He decides to live with Yefim instead. On his way to the village he sees the Fire-Fairy again. He follows her and gets lost in the forest, but the maid dances around him, and the snow melts. The winter turns into summer, flowers bloom, birds start singing on a birch tree. The Fairy laughs at Fedyunka and gives him an old spade that leads him out of the forest. Next day Fedyunka and Yefim go back to the birch tree and find a lot of gold. They cannot keep the secret for long, and eventually the landlord takes hold of the place, but Fedyunka and Yefim live in wealth for many years.

== Analysis ==
Denis Zherdev noted that Bazhov liked the idea of a child together with an old man contacting the mythical creatures. These people are traditionally portrayed as the closest to the otherworldly, but at the same time they are the least reliable narrators in the adult world.

Yelena Prikazchikova commented that the Fairy's gift of the magic spade can be regarded as spiritual. The spade only does magic because it is used by skilled human hands. The magic power is contains is nothing but Fedyunka's real skill. He is a metaphor for a young gold prospector moved by his insatiable thirst of knowledge, which had been recently awakened in him by old experienced miners.

== Adaptations ==
- A 1956 filmstrip The Fire-Fairy.
- A 1968 docufiction feature film Tales of the Ural Mountains (Russian: Сказы уральских гор, romanized: Skazy uralskikh gor) about the work of Bazhov contains an episode based on "The Fire-Fairy".
- The Fire Maid, 1973 opera for schools with music by Robert Long, story adapted and lyrics by Dorothy Gulliver. Published in London by Oxford University Press.

=== The 1979 film ===
The children's hand-drawn animated film Ognevushka-poskakushka (The Fire-Fairy) was made by Soyuzmultfilm in 1979. It was directed and written by Natalia Golovanova, with music composed by Viktor Kuprevich. The main characters of the film are the boy Fedyunka (voiced by Galina Ivanova) and his grandfather (voiced by Lev Durov). In the winter the grandfather finds out that they have little food left. His grandson Fedya goes to the forest, visits to the Fire-Fairy (voiced by Viktoria Lepko) and asks her for some potatoes.

Animators

- Marina Voskaniants
- Marina Rogova
- Violetta Kolesnikova
- Vladimir Krumin
- Leonid Kayukov
- Vladimir Vyshegorodtsev
- Alexander Gorlenko
- Lev Ryabinin
