= Dumnaya =

Mountain in Russia

Dumnaya mountain
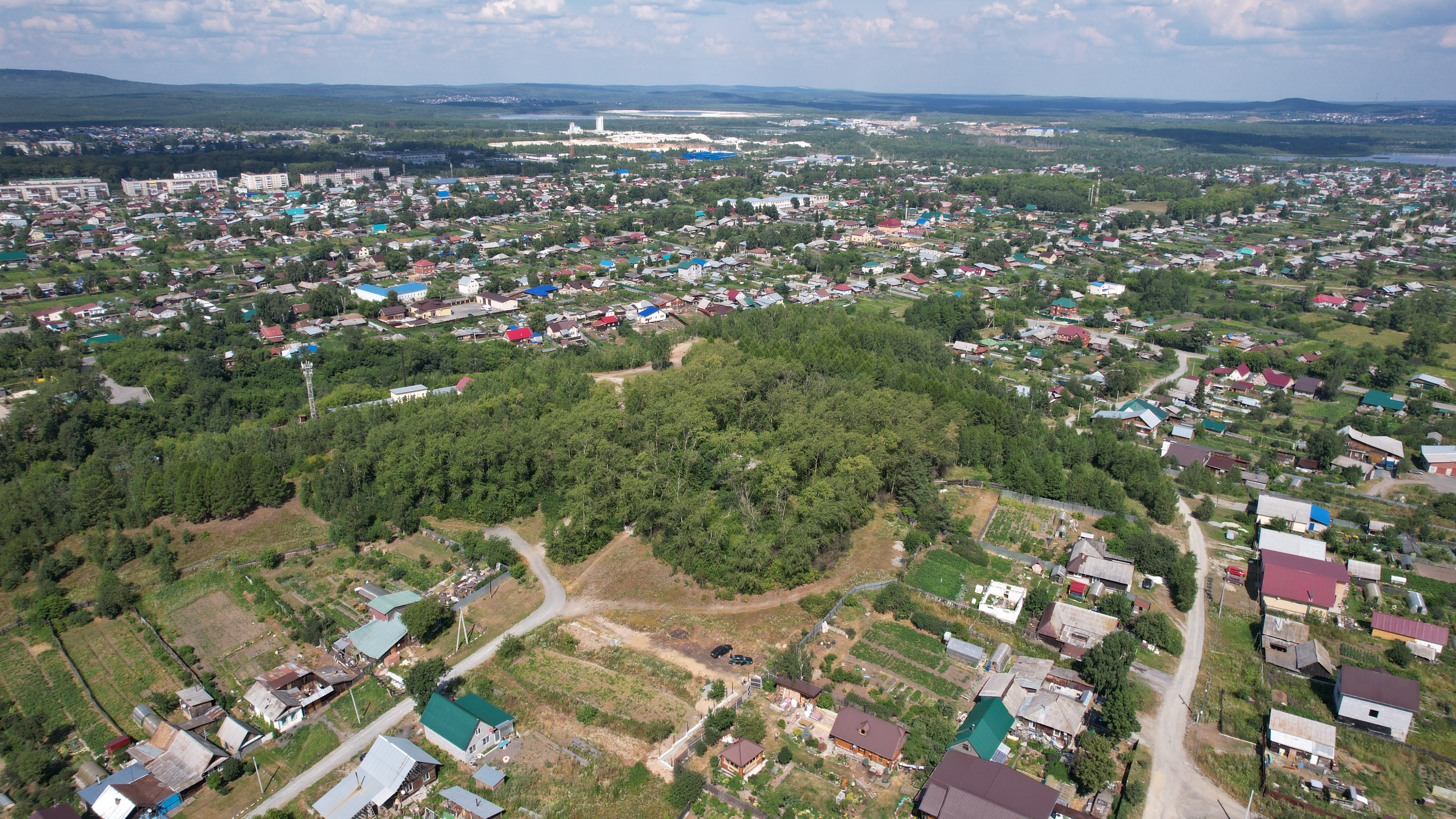
- View from the top

Highest point
- Elevation: 409 m (1,342 ft)
- Coordinates: 56°26′22″N 60°11′22″E

Geography
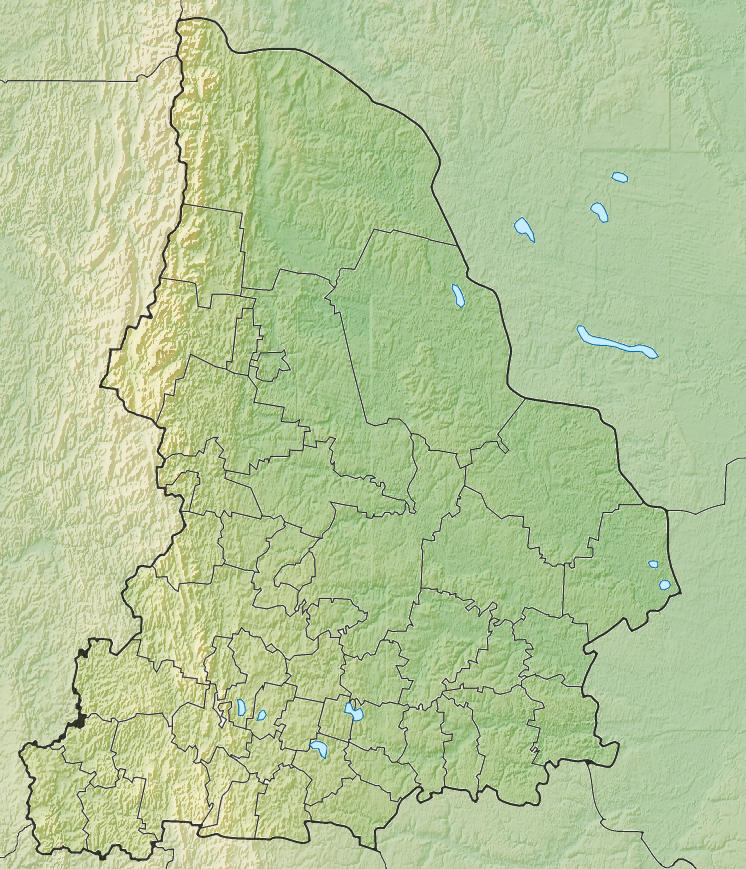
- Location within Sverdlovsk Oblast Location within European Russia
- Country: Russia
- Region: Sverdlovsk Oblast
- Parent range: Central Ural Mountains

Dumnaya mountain (Russian: Думская гора), is a peak in the old part of the town of Polevskoy in Sverdlovsk Oblast, on the right bank of the Polevaya river. The top of the hill is flat, covered with birch forest, the western slope steepens towards the river bank. The northern slope is more gentle, and the mountain massif extends a kilometer to the east. The Polevskoy Copper Smelting Plant operated from 1724 to 1930 beneath the mountain on the riverbank.

Dumnaya mountain has the status of a geological and geomorphological natural monument and historical and archeological monument.

== Geographical position ==
The mountain is located on the right bank of the Polevaya river (the basin of the Chusovaya river), in the southern part of the town of Polevskoy. The height of the mountain is 409 meters, the area is 3,5 ha.

== Toponym ==
There are several versions of the origin of the mountain's name. According to local legends, recorded by the academician Peter Simon Pallas, who visited the Polevsky factory 3 years before the Pugachev's Rebellion, the mountain was named so "because of the former skhotbishche on it, for the agreement among the workers who revolted during the laying of this factory".

According to another legend, in 1773, a gang of Pugachevs appeared near the mountain to attack the factory. As they approached the mountain, they saw three old men on horseback, whom they tried to capture. At the same time they saw a large army behind the mountain, which made them "think twice" and run away. The mountain was named in honour of this event and a chapel was built on it.

== History ==
Dumnaya mountain was the site of a hillfort (Russian: городище, gorodishche) - place of metallurgical production of itkul culture. The monument was discovered by Dmitry Nikolayevich Anuchin and Fyodor Alekseevich Uvarov in 1877, and further examined by many archaeologists. The first detailed description was given by E. M. Bers.

The largest center of metallurgy in the Ural appeared in the middle of the first millennium B.C. Smelting furnaces were located on the mountain, surrounded by an earthen rampart with a low wooden wall on it. The complete metallurgical cycle included ore extraction from a deposit near the mountain, smelting and production of finished metal products, mainly arrowheads. Metallurgists used foundry molds consisting of several parts, mastered the techniques of drawing, welding, and grinding metal. Oxidized ores were used, animal bones served as fluxes, and furnaces were heated with charcoal. Since simple smelting furnaces were used, where no forced bellows were provided, a well-blown mountaintop was chosen for the construction of horns. In the 1950s and 1980s, traces of copper smelting and the remains of furnaces dating back to the 3rd to 2nd centuries before.

The same copper mines near the mountain were used later. The ancient mines were discovered during the development of the territory by the Russians, and samples of copper ore from them were delivered to Verkhoturye and Tobolsk in 1702. The ore was examined by the Andrew Vinius, duma diak of the Sibirskiy prikaz, who instructed local authorities to organize mining. Regular mining began in 1708, despite the relatively low copper content of the ore. It was carried out at the southwestern foot of Dumnaya mountain. Later in 1709, a richer Gumyoshevskoe deposit was discovered nearby.

In 1724-1725, the Polevskoy Copper Smelting Plant was built near Dumnaya mountain.

The characteristics of the mountain were first documented in 1867 by Ernst Reinhold von Hofmann in Gornyj zhurnal (Russian: Горный журнал). He estimated the mountain's elevation above Polevaya to be 173 ft, and 1,248 ft above sea level.

In 1960, the mountain and its surroundings were taken under protection as a natural monument. The area of the protected territory is 3.5 ha.

== Attractions ==
- Before the revolution there was the Voznesenskaya (Russian: Вознесенская) chapel on the top of Dumnaya mountain. At the end of the XIX century during the church holidays, there were processions to the mountain. The chapel was demolished in the 1920s, and in 2011 parishioners of St. Peter and Paul Church of Polevsky built a six-meter high cross in place of the demolished chapel.
- A mass grave near the summit contains the remains of six locals who were shot by the White Army in July 1918. A monument was built over the grave in 1929, bearing the inscription "Heroes Fallen for Freedom". On a marble pedestal stands a cast-iron figure of a worker with a rifle and a hammer in his hands. The sculpture was cast at the Kaslinsky Factory from a model by the sculptor Klodt, a descendant of the author of the sculptural groups on the Anichkov Bridge in St. Petersburg.

== In literature ==
The future writer Pavel Petrovich Bazhov lived in Polevskoy plant from 1892 to 1895. On Dumnaya mountain at that time there was a large firewood area for the needs of the factory. To guard the firewood there was a gatehouse where children would gather to listen to the tales of one of the watchmen, Grandpa Slyshko (Vasily Alekseevich Khmelinin). These stories, in which the Dumnaya Gora often appears, the writer later translated them into tales that made up the collection 'The Malachite Box'. The short story "Karaulka on Dumnaya mountain" became the preface to the book. In his memoirs Bazhov also recounts the words of a coachman when he moved to Polevskoy: "Here, they say, Pugachev sat for three days, thinking. That's why Dumnaya is called". Apparently, this story reflects the above story about an attempt by one of Pugachev's detachments to attack the factory (Pugachev himself was not in these places).

In Bazhov's tale "Dorogoe imjatchko" (Russian: Дорогое имячко), another pure folklore version of the origin of the mountain's name is stated. It says that in the cave of the mountain, now buried, "old people" lived (Mansi, White-Eyed Chud). They were not interested in the mineral trade. When the land was filled with belligerent Russian treasure hunters, the old people gathered for a council. "They thought here for three whole days. That's why the mountain is called Dumnaya. It used to have a different name. They thought it over and decided to move to a new place where there is no gold at all, but animals, birds and fish in abundance".

== See also ==
- Pavel Bazhov
- Sverdlovsk Oblast
- Ural Mountains

== Bibliography ==
- Бажов, П. П. (1952). Бажова, В. А.; Сурков, А. А.; Пермяк, Е. А. (eds.). Сочинения в трех томах. Vol. 2. Moscow: Государственное издательство художественной литературы.
- Бельтикова, Г. В.; Стоянов, В. Е. (1984). "Городище Думной горы — место специализированного металлургического производства. (Предварительное сообщение)". Древние поселения Урала и Западной Сибири. Yekaterinburg: Уральский государственный университет.
- Алексеев, В. В., ed. (2001). "Металлургические заводы Урала XVII—XX вв." (PDF). Энциклопедия. Yekaterinburg: Издательство Академкнига. ISBN 5-93472-057-0. Archived from the original (PDF) on 2021-10-20.
- Берс, Е. М. (1963). Археологические памятники Свердловска и его окрестностей (2nd ed.). Yekaterinburg: Свердловское книжное издательство.
- Горюн, А. (1998). Города нашего края. Полевской. Yekaterinburg: Средне-Уральское книжное издательство.
- Архипова, Н. П. (1972). Окрестности Свердловска. Yekaterinburg: Среднеуральское книжное издательство.
- Черных, Е.Н. (1970). "Древнейшая металлургия Урала и Поволжья" (PDF). Материалы и исследования по археологии СССР (172–1). Moscow: Наука.
- Потапова, Н. А.; Назырова, Р. И.; Забелина, Н. М.; Исаева-Петрова, Л. С.; Коротков, Н. М.; Очагов, Д. М. (2006). Очагов, Д. М. (ed.). Сводный список особо охраняемых природных территорий Российской Федерации (справочник) (PDF). 2. ВНИИприроды.
- Суренков, В. Н. (1998). "Легенды и предания Полевского". Полевской край. Yekaterinburg: Уралтрейд.
