= Stepan's Remembrance =

1977 film by Konstantin Yershov

- Directed by: Konstantin Yershov
- Written by: Gleb Panfilov; Konstantin Yershov
- Starring: Larisa Chikurova, Gennady Yegorov, Natalya Andrejchenko
- Cinematography: Evgeny Shapiro
- Music by: Vadim Bibergan
- Production company: Lenfilm
- Release date: 1977
- Running time: 85 minutes
- Country: Soviet Union
- Language: Russian

Stepan's Remembrance (Russian: Степанова памятка, romanized: Stepanova pamyatka) is a 1977 Soviet children's film directed by Konstantin Yershov. It is an adaptation of Pavel Bazhov's stories based on the Ural region Russian folklore. The stories were published The Malachite Box collection in 1939.

== Production ==
The film director Konstantin Yershov wanted to change the traditional approach to the fairy tales adaptations. He felt that he did not need to create a magic spectacle, but rather to make a film which would be realistic at heart. He was interested in the characters, life and traditions of the Serfdom era.

== Plot ==
The film loosely follows the plot of Bazhov's folk tale The Mistress of the Copper Mountain. A skilled miner Stepan meets the green-eyed Mistress of the Copper Mountain, the Malachite Lady. Stepan is disrespectful towards her, calling her "wench", but she appreciates his bravery. She orders him to relay her words to the bailiff Severyan Nazarovich: "The Mistress of the Copper Mountain orders you, ye stinking goat, to get out of Krasnogorka". She promises to marry Stepan if he does so. The bailiff is enraged at the miner's impudence. Stepan is flogged, sent to a mine face and fed only dog food. The Mistress visits him and releases him from the mine. She shows him many treasures and the image of his daughter, although Stepan has no daughter and not even married yet. The Mistress says that her real name is Kseniya, and proposes marriage once again. Stepan honestly replies that he already promised to marry another girl, Nastya. The Malachite Lady is upset, but she likes his fidelity and bravery. She promises to solve his troubles with the bailiff and rewards him with a present for his bride, a malachite casket filled with jewellery. She warns him against ever thinking about her. The bailiff soon dies and Stepan is freed from his Master. He marries Nastya, but still has visions of the Malachite Lady and often sees small lizards, her servants. The Mistress continues watching over his family. Stepan's wife Nastya gives birth to a daughter Tanyushka and a son Melesha. The green-eyed Tanyushka likes lizards and gemstones. Stepan starts going to the copper mine to see the Mistress of the Copper Mountain. Sometimes Tanyushka joins them too. One day, watching them, Stepan shoots himself in the chest, but survives. He does not speak to the Malachite Lady again.

The second part of the film is based on The Malachite Casket. Years pass, Stepan gets older. He is especially close with his daughter, calling her "his remembrance". She is a beauty, and a lot of men are infatuated with her, including the new bailiff Parfyon Semyonovich. One day Stepan mentions his dream of seeing the malachite room at the imperial palace. He asks his wife to wear the jewellery from the Malachite Casket, but Tanyushka puts them on instead. She claims that they "warm her up", as if she is sitting by the fire. After Stepan's death, a young noble man Vasily Turchaninov, the owner of the mines' son, falls in love with Tanyushka. He asks for Nastya's permission to marry her daughter. Tanyushka claims that she is unsure of his feelings and announces that she will agree to the marriage if he shows her the malachite room at the imperial palace. After Vasily leaves, Tanyushka confesses to her mother that she actually likes the man, but she feels that his love will not last and therefore hides behind her pride. At the palace, noble people laugh at the girl's simple clothes, and Vasily is ashamed of her. Tanyushka rejects him, leans against the malachite wall and melts away. She comes back home to her mother and brother.

== Cast ==
- Larisa Chikurova as The Mistress of the Copper Mountain
- Gennady Yegorov as Stepan
- Irina Gubanova as Nastya, his wife
- Natalya Andrejchenko as Tanyushka, his daughter
- Igor Kostolevsky as Vasily Turchaninov, the noble man in love with Tanyushka
- Lev Krugly as Severyan Nazarovich, the bailiff on the mine
- Dima Dymov as Melesha, Stepan's son
- Igor Yefimov as Parfyon Semyonovich, the new bailiff
- Boris Arakelov as Parfyon's servant
- Mikhail Svetin as Dimitriy, the door-keeper at the imperial palace
- Arkady Trusov as The Miner
- Victor Chekmaryov as Savva Turchaninov, the landlord and the owner of the mines

== Reception ==
G. Yermakova praised the protagonist's significant spiritual growth and the acting of Gennady Yegorov, noting that such a remarkable performance is true success for any young actor: "He portrayed Stepan with the captivating sincerity, having created the image of the remarkable and talented person". She also stated that "The greatest luck of the film is the poetic [...] embodiment of huge and tragic love between Stepan and the Mistress of the Copper Mountain". For a long time Gennady Yegorov was closely associated with the character from Stepan's Remembrance, he later said that people often called him "Stepan".
