= Mount Azov =

Mountain in Russia

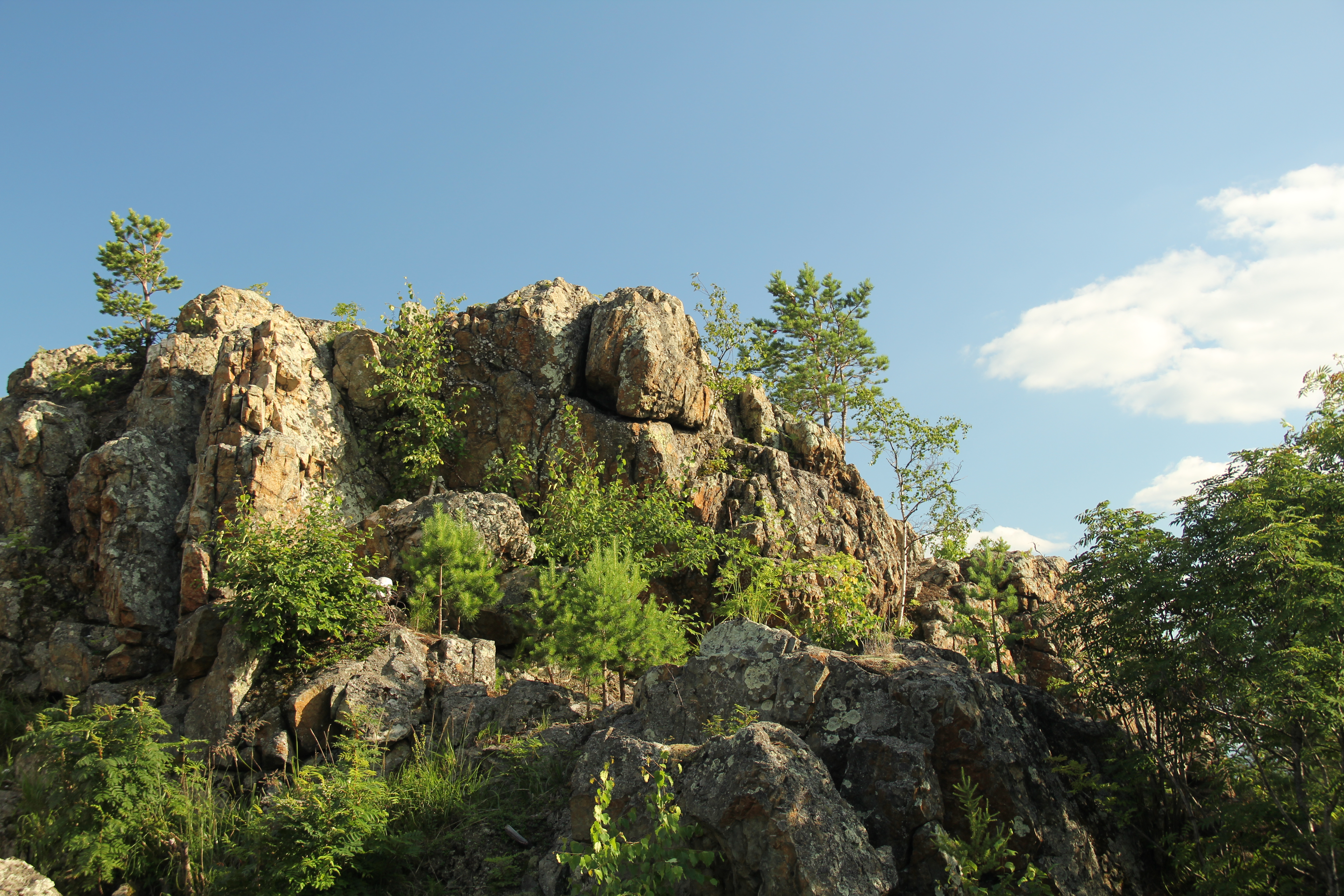
- Mount Azov, 2011

Highest point
- Elevation: 588 m (1,929 ft)
- Coordinates: 56°28′31″N 60°05′11″E

Geography
- Location within Russia
- Parent range: Ural Mountains

Azov (Russian: Азов) is a mountain in Central Ural, Russia. It is located 8 km from Polevskoy meat Zyuzelsky village. It's one of the natural monuments of Russia.

According to Aleksandr Matveyev, the configuration of the rocks gives a reason to believe that the name of the mountain derives from the Tatar word azaw teš (азау теш), meaning 'molar tooth'. In other Turkic languages the word means 'fang', 'edge', or 'sting'. The archaeologist E. Bers believed that in the Iron Age it served as a sacrificial place.

According to popular beliefs, a creature from local folktales called Azovka (lit. 'the Azov girl') lives inside Mount Azov.
