= Vladimir Biryukov =

Soviet historian and ethnographer (1893–1968)

- Born: 22 July 1888; Pershinskoye, Shadrinsky Uyezd, Perm Governorate, Russian Empire
- Died: 18 June 1971 (aged 82); Sverdlovsk, Sverdlovsk Oblast, Russian Soviet Federative Socialist Republic, Soviet Union
- Education: Perm Theological Seminary, Moscow Archaeological Institute

Vladimir Pavlovich Biryukov (Russian: Владимир Павлович Бирюков; 10 O.S./22 July 1888–18 June 1971) was a Soviet ethnographer, lexicographer, museum worker, archaeologist, historian, folklorist, and the author of over 30 books. He specifically studied the folklore of the Ural region of Siberia.

== Career ==
Vladimir Biryukov was born in the Pershinskoye village, Perm Governorate (now Dalmatovsky District, Kurgan Oblast) in the family of the secretary-accountant. He studied at the Perm Theological Seminary, but eventually decided against becoming a priest. He graduated from the Kazan Veterinary Institute in 1912 and then from the Moscow Archaeological Institute in 1915. He became an archaeologist. For two years he studied at the Russian State Agricultural University, attended classes at the Tomsk State University since the end of 1919.

In 1910 Vladimir Biryukov organized a museum in Pershinskoye, the first village museum in the area. The museum was transferred to Shadrinsk and now called the Shadrinsk Local History Museum named after V. P. Biryukov. Since 1920 he headed the Museum of Antiquities under the Perm State University. Since 1923 he was an active member of the Academy of Sciences of the USSR, participating in conferences and plenary meetings. From the 1920s to 1933 he edited the Academy of Sciences's Russian Language Dictionary. When in the mid-1930s Sverdlovsk Publishing House decided to publish the collection Prerevolutionary Folklore of the Urals, he was offered to make such a collection.

From 1930 to 1938 he worked in Sverdlovsk, in the regional bureau that studied local culture, then lived in Shadrinsk and then in Sverdlovsk again. He became the member of the Union of Soviet Writers in 1955. He died and was buried in Sverdlovsk.

== Selected publications ==
- Cemetery as a subject for studies and a place for excursions (Russian: Кладбище как предмет изучения и место для экскурсий), 1922
- Sketches of local history (Russian: Очерки краеведческой работы), 1923
- Nature and population of the Shadrinsk okrug, Ural region (Russian: Природа и население Шадринского округа Уральской области), 1926
- Questionnaire on local history (Russian: Краеведческий вопросник), 1929
- Historical information on the studying of local culture. The collection of articles on local history (Russian: Историческая справка по краеведению. Сборник краеведческих статей), 1930
- From the history of porcelain and faience in Priisetye. The collection of articles on local history (Russian: Из истории фарфорово-фаянсового дела в Приисетье. Сборник краеведческих статей), 1930
- Why, where and how to look for minerals (short manual) (Russian: Для чего, где и как искать полезные ископаемые (краткое руководство)), 1932
- Search for the new oil and gas fields at the Urals (Russian: О поисках на Урале новых месторождений нефти и газа), 1933
- The Iset River (Russian: Река Исеть), 1936
- Prerevolutionary Folklore of the Urals (Russian: Дореволюционный фольклор на Урале, romanized: Dorevoljucionnyj folklor na Urale), 1936
- Poets in the second half of the 19th century. Selected works (Russian: Поэты второй половины XIX века. Избранные произведения), 1937
- Skazy, songs, chastushkas (Russian: Сказы, песни, частушки), 1937
- Ural fairy tales (Russian: Уральские сказки), 1940
- Ural folklore. Historical skazy and songs (Russian: Фольклор Урала. Исторические сказы и песни), 1949
- Soviet Ural. Folk stories and oral poetry (Russian: Урал советский. Народные рассказы и устное поэтическое творчество), 1958
- The first steps of the social democratic movement in Shadrinsk (Russian: Первые шаги социал-демократического движения в Шадринске), 1960
