= Gumyoshevsky mine =

Copper mine in Russia

The Gumyoshevsky mine (Russian: Гумёшевский рудник, romanized: Gumjoshevskij rudnik), also called Gumeshki, Gumeshevsky or Gumishevskoye mine is a copper mine located in the town of Polevskoy, in Sverdlovsk Oblast of Russia. It has estimated reserves of 48.5 million tonnes of ore grading 1.02% copper. It was called "The Copper Mountain" or simply "The Mountain" by the local populace.

Gumyoshevsky mine is one of the oldest mines of the Ural Mountains, from its early history at the Bronze Age. It was in use from the mid-2nd millennium BC and continued to be used for centuries.

In 1758 large deposits of oxidized copper were discovered there. In the 18th century Gumyoshevsky mine represented the largest copper reserve of the Ural Mountains, and gained fame as the major supplier of malachite. It produced 450-480 tons of copper annually. About 500 workers were employed at the mine. The Gumyoshevsky malachite was popular because of its exceptional quality. It was used for decorating the Winter Palace, Saint Michael's Castle, the Palace of Versailles, the Saint Isaac's Cathedral. The samples of ores and minerals from the mine are now kept in the museums around the world, e.g. in the Museum für Naturkunde in Berlin, Germany.

For a long time it supplied ore for Polevskoy Copper Smelting Plant (1724–1870).
