= Valentin Blazhes =

Valentin Vladimirovich Blazhes (Russian: Валентин Владимирович Блажес; 29 February 1936 – 26 January 2012) was a Soviet and Russian folklorist and literary scholar, Professor of the Ural State University, Doctor of Sciences, a member of the Russian Head Council for Philological Sciences. He was an expert in the fields of Old Russian literature, folk literature and folklore, especially the folklore of the Ural region, which he became interested in as a student. He studied Russian epic poetry, folk culture and language, workers' folklore, the Remezov Chronicle, the Stroganov Chronicle, and other Old Russian Chronicles. He authored a number of articles on historical, toponymic, family folklore.

== Biography ==
Blazhes was born in the Vedyonovka village, Seryshevsky District, Amur Oblast. He served in the Soviet army from 1955 to 1958, and after that entered the Ural State University. In 1963 he graduated from the Philological Department. He worked for two years as a teacher at Russian school near Sysert. In 1967 he married the Latin Professor Lyudmila Dorovskikh (Людмила Доровских). He then headed the Folklore and Ancient Literature Department at the university, and was a dean of the Philology Department from 1988 to 2004. He also the member of the academic senate of the United Museum of Ural Writers from 1994 to 1999. From 1993 until death he led the folkloric expeditions of the Ural University.

== Selected publications ==
- The pithiness of the art form in Russian legendary epos (Russian: Содержательность художественной формы русского былевого эпоса, romanized: Soderzhatelnost khudozhestvennoj formy russkogo bylevogo eposa), 1977
- P. P. Bazhov and workers' folklore (Russian: П. П. Бажов и рабочий фольклор, romanized: P. P. Bazhov i rabochij folklor), 1982
- Satire and humour in the prerevolutionary folklore of Ural workers (Russian: Сатира и юмор в дореволюционном фольклоре рабочих Урала, romanized: Satira i jumor v dorevoljucionnom folklore rabochikh Urala), 1987
