= Polevskoy =

Town in Sverdlovsk Oblast, Russia

Polevskoy Полевской
- Town
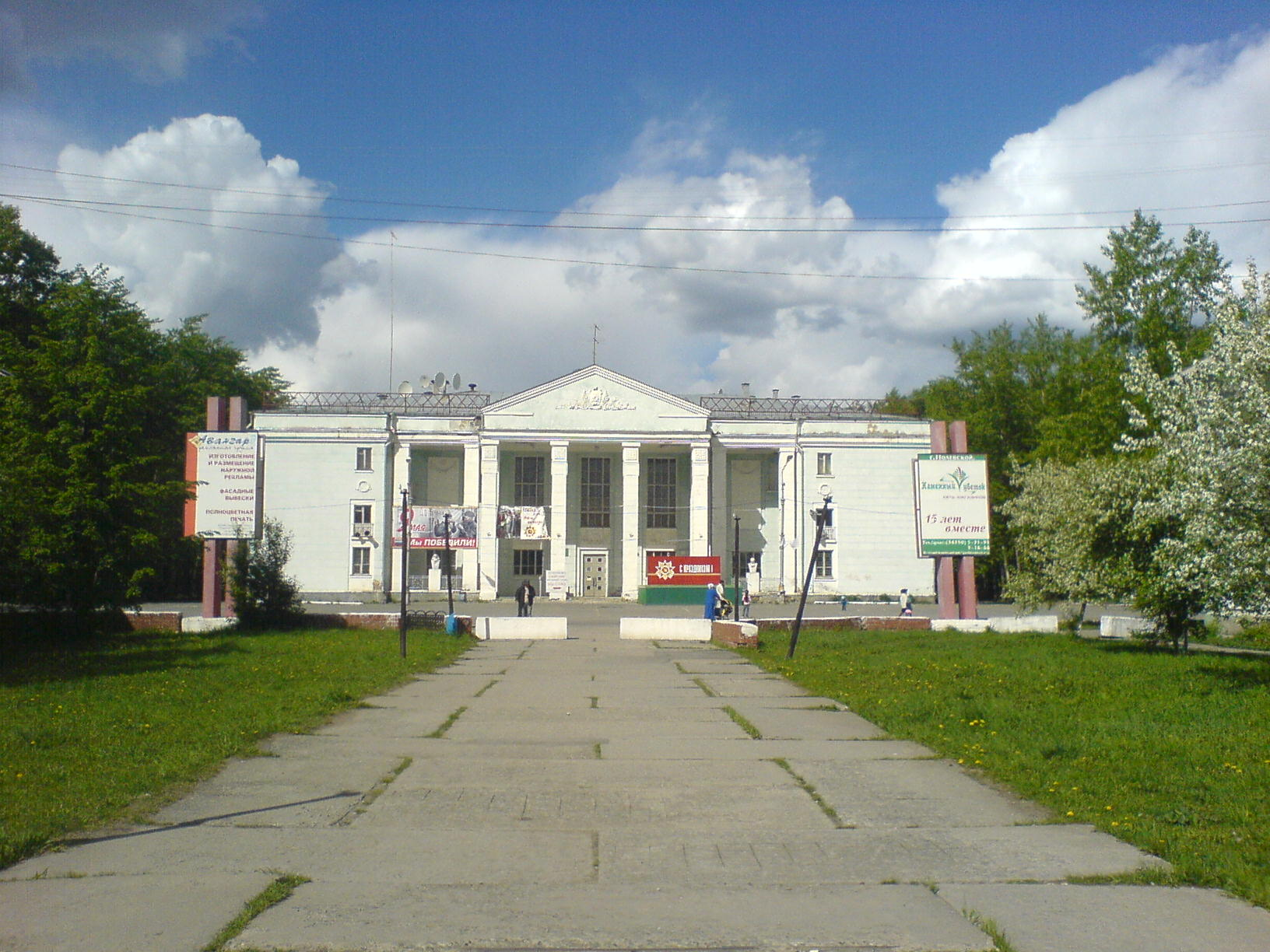
- Palace of Culture in Polevskoy

- Flag Coat of arms
- Interactive map of Polevskoy
- Location of Polevskoy Polevskoy (Sverdlovsk Oblast)
- Coordinates: 56°27′N 60°11′E
- Country: Russia
- Federal subject: Sverdlovsk Oblast
- Founded: First quarter of the 18th century
- Elevation: 360 m (1,180 ft)

Population (2010 Census)
  - Total: 64,220
  - Estimate (2025): 53,366 (−16.9%)
  - Rank: 245th in 2010

Administrative status
  - Subordinated to: Town of Polevskoy
  - Capital of: Town of Polevskoy

Municipal status
  - Urban okrug: Polevskoy Urban Okrug
  - Capital of: Polevskoy Urban Okrug
- Time zone: UTC+5 (MSK+2)
- Postal codes: 623380, 623382–623385, 623388, 623389, 623391
- OKTMO ID: 65754000001
- Website: polevsk.midural.ru

Polevskoy (Russian: Полевско́й) is a town in Sverdlovsk Oblast, Russia, located 50 kilometers (31 mi) southwest of Yekaterinburg, the administrative center of the oblast. Population: 64,220 (2010 census); 66,761 (2002 census); 70,632 (1989 Soviet census); 60,000 (1974); 25,000 (1939).

== History ==
The town is best known for its Dumnaya mountain, where a monument to those who died fighting Kolchak's army is located. The mountain and its surroundings are also mentioned in many tales by Pavel Bazhov.

The town was founded in the first quarter of the 18th century as a settlement around copper mines. The first mine was established in 1702 and the commercial development started in 1718. In 1724–1727, the Polevskoy Copper Smelting Plant was built to process the copper.

The modern town comprises the territories of former settlements of Gumeshki, Polevskoy, and Seversky.

== Flag ==
The flag of Polevskoy consists of the Venus symbol (♀), which represents the chemical element copper, the character Lizard Queen of Russian folklore, the symbolic representation of the Stone Flower from the story of the same name, and the eight-pointed star, the brand of the Seversky Pipe Plant.

== Administrative and municipal status ==
Within the framework of the administrative divisions, it is, together with thirteen rural localities, incorporated as the Town of Polevskoy—an administrative unit with the status equal to that of the districts. As a municipal division, the Town of Polevskoy is incorporated as Polevskoy Urban Okrug.

== Sports ==
The bandy team Seversky Trubnik plays in a recreational league.
