= Demyan Bedny =

Soviet poet (1883–1945)

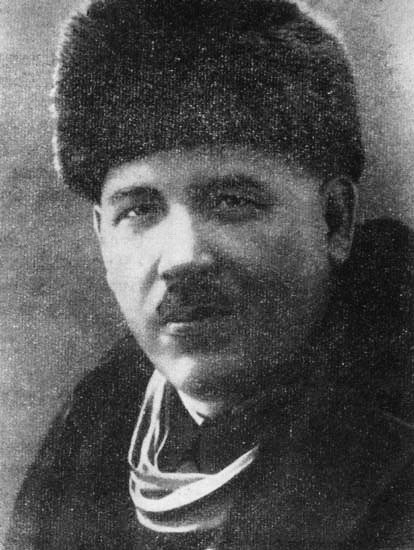
- Born: Yefim Alekseevich Pridvorov; April 13, 1883; Kherson Governorate, Russian Empire
- Died: May 19, 1945 (aged 62); Moscow, Russian SFSR, Soviet Union
- Education: Saint Petersburg State University
- Occupations: Poet, journalist, satirist, public figure
- Writing career
- Notable awards: Order of Lenin

Yefim Alekseevich Pridvorov (Russian: Ефи́м Алексе́евич Придво́ров, IPA: [jɪˈfʲim ɐlʲɪˈksʲejɪvʲɪtɕ prʲɪˈdvorəf]; 13 April [O.S. 1 April] 1883 – May 25, 1945), better known by the pen name Demyan Bedny (Russian: Демья́н Бе́дный, IPA: [dʲɪˈmʲjan ˈbʲednɨj], Damian the Poor), was a Soviet Russian poet, Bolshevik propagandist and satirist.

== Life ==
Yefim Pridvorov was born to a poor family in the village of Hubivka, in Kherson Governorate, now in Ukraine. At the age of seven, his father took him to live in Yelysavethrad, but six years later, he was sent back to his home village to live with his mother "in extreme poverty". When he was 14, his father secured him a paid-for place in a feldsher training college in Kiev, which was followed by four years of military service. In 1904, he entered the philological and historical faculty of Petersburg University. His university years coincided with the heady times of the 1905 Russian Revolution, which Pridvorov, like most other students, became an ardent supporter. In 1911, he began to be published in communist newspapers such as Pravda, and in 1912, he joined the Russian Social Democratic Labour Party (Bolsheviks). Also in 1911, he published the poem "Of Demyan Bedny," which led to him being known by that name, and he began a private correspondence with Vladimir Lenin that was said to develop into a long-lasting personal friendship. His first collected works were published in Basni (Fables) in 1913. During World War I, he once again saw service as a feldsher and was decorated.

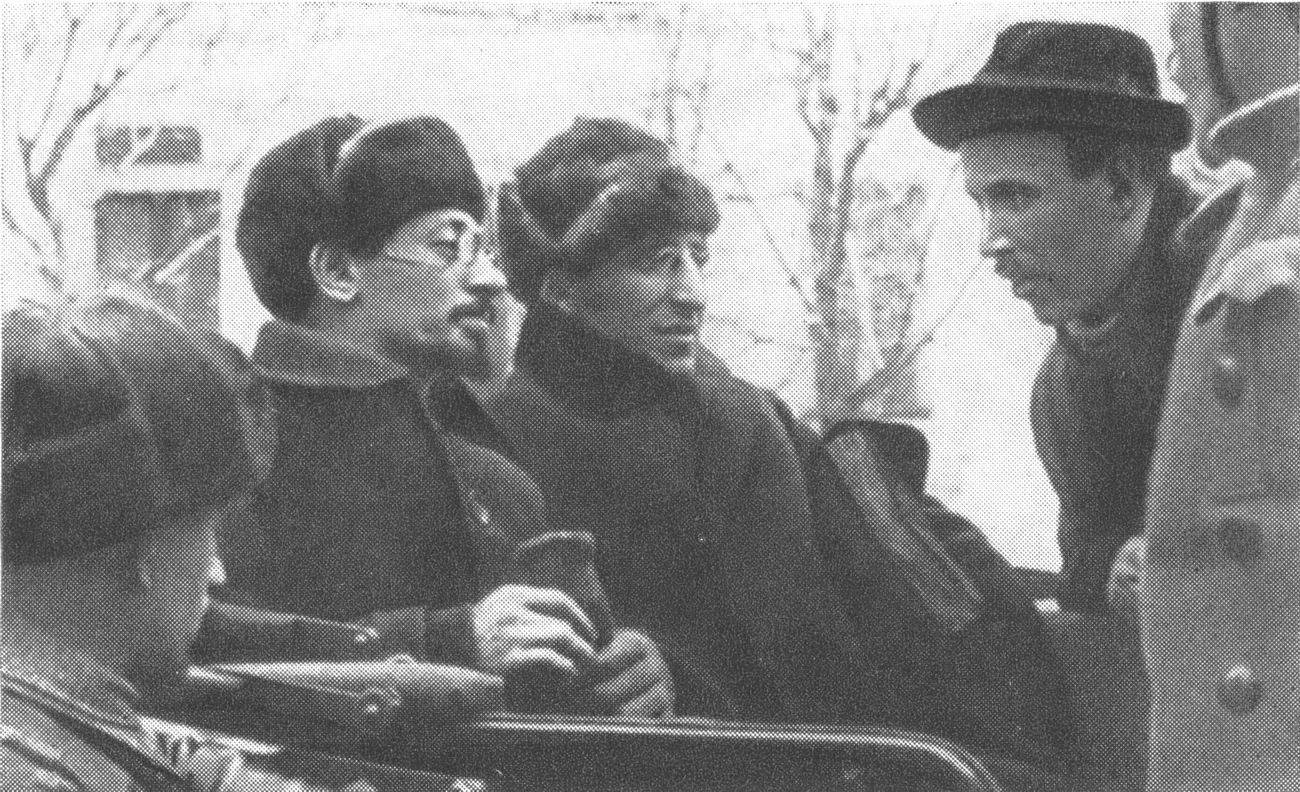
Demyan Bedny speaking with Bolshevik leaders Yakov Sverdlov and Varlam Avanesov

He was a steadfast supporter of the Bolshevik cause throughout the 1917 Russian Revolution and the Russian Civil War by writing agitprop from the frontlines. He wrote "Bolshevik Leaves Home" while at the front in Sviyazhsk in 1918. Arthur Ransome described him in 1919 as "fatter than he used to be (admirers from the country send him food) with a round face, shrewd laughing eyes, and cynical mouth, a typical peasant." He was decorated with the Order of the Red Banner in 1923, followed by the Order of Lenin in 1933. In the 1920s and the 1930s, he was very popular and variously supported by the Soviet regime. The town of Spassk, Penza Oblast, was even renamed Bednodemyanovsk in his honour. He was the only writer to be allocated rooms in the Kremlin. His first political setback came in December 1930, when two of his historical poems were censured by the Party Central Committee. He wrote a plaintive letter to Stalin asking, and received a long reply accusing him of having insulted the Russian working class. Stalin also disliked a play that Bedny had written in 1932 about the Red Army, calling it "mediocre".

In September 1932, a report stating Bedny's debauched life during a Soviet Communist Party Poliburo meeting made Stalin decide to evict Bedny from his Kremlin apartment. He was relocated to Rozhdestvensky Boulevard, which he called a rat's barn. He told the poet Osip Mandelstam that he had been reported by a secretary, who had heard him complain that Stalin left grubby finger marks on books borrowed from Bedny's private library, but it appears that Bedny's real offence was that his writings were highly critical of Russia's imperialist past, but Stalin, though he was not an ethnic Russian, "nevertheless grasped that Russian nationalism was the glue that held the Soviet Union together". In November 1936, the Politburo condemned Bedny's opera The Bogatyrs for its "antihistorical and mocking depiction of Old Russia's acceptance of Christianity." He tried to regain favour with verses virulently attacking prominent victims of the Great Purge. His poem that as published in Pravda on 21 August 1936 to mark the show trial of Grigori Zinoviev and others was headed 'No Mercy'.

On 12 June 1937, he published a 54-line poem celebrating the previous day's announcement that Marshal Tukhachevsky and other Red Army commanders had been arrested, which included all of their names in a rhyming scheme. Nonetheless, in 1938, Bedny was stripped of membership in the Communist Party and of the Union of Soviet Writers, and in 1941, Stalin remarked to Georgi Dimitrov "ten volumes of verse by Demyan Bedny are not worth one poem of Mayakovsky's". However, Bedny slowly regained the favour of Stalin during World War II. Bedny's poem commemorating the Soviet victory was published in Pravda on May 3, 1945. He died two weeks later, on May 19 and was buried at the Novodevichy Cemetery.

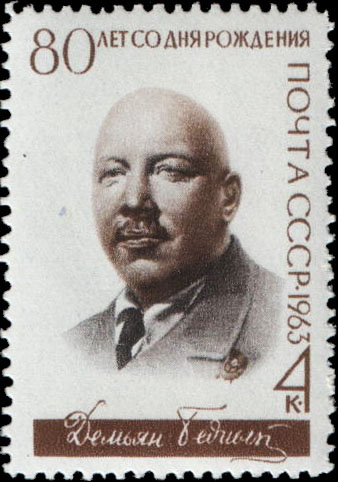
Soviet 1963 commemorative stamp featuring Demyan Bedny

== Trivia ==
- Bedny's caustic anti-religious poem New Testament without defects (Новый Завет без изъяна) may have inspired Mikhail Bulgakov's The Master and Margarita as a rebuttal. In addition, his character was a prototype for Mikhail Berlioz and Bezdomny (Homeless) was a parody on Bedny's pseudonym. Bulgakov did not normally take pleasure in hearing that someone had been denounced but made an exception when Bedny ran into trouble in 1938. "He's not going to be chortling over anyone else. Let him feel it for himself," he said.
- Bedny attended the execution of Socialist-Revolutionary Fanny Kaplan, who was convicted for attempting to kill Lenin "for artistic inspiration," but according to witnesses, he felt sick once the Chekists started burning Kaplan's disfigured corpse.
- Bedny amassed one of the largest private libraries in the Soviet Union (over 30,000 volumes) from which Stalin was known to borrow books on occasion.
- According to Nikita Khrushchev's memoirs, Bedny was his favourite poet.
