= Seversky Pipe Plant =

Russian manufacturing plant

- Location in Russia
- Operated: 15 January 1739-
- Location: 623388, Sverdlovsk Oblast, Polevskoy, Vershinina St. 7; Polevskoy, Russia
- Coordinates: 56.479°N 60.24°E
- Industry: ferrous metallurgy
- Products: Hot-rolled pipes
- Employees: approx. 8,000
- Owner: OAO TMK

The Seversky Pipe Plant (Russian: Северский трубный завод), also known as Severna, was one of the major manufacturing plants located in Polevskoy, Sverdlovsk Oblast of Russia. It is one of the oldest Russian plants at the Urals.

In the early-1730s rich deposits of iron ore were discovered around the Polevskoy village, situated on the river Severushka. In 1734 Vasily Tatishchev chose the site for the plant construction, which began on 1 April 1735. A village grew around the plant, which is now the northern part of the town Polevskoy. All production was branded with the eight-pointed star, which is now present in the Polevskoy's coat of arms. In 1757 the Polevskoy Plant was purchased by the Ural merchant Alexei Turchaninov along with the Polevskoy Copper Smelting Plant.

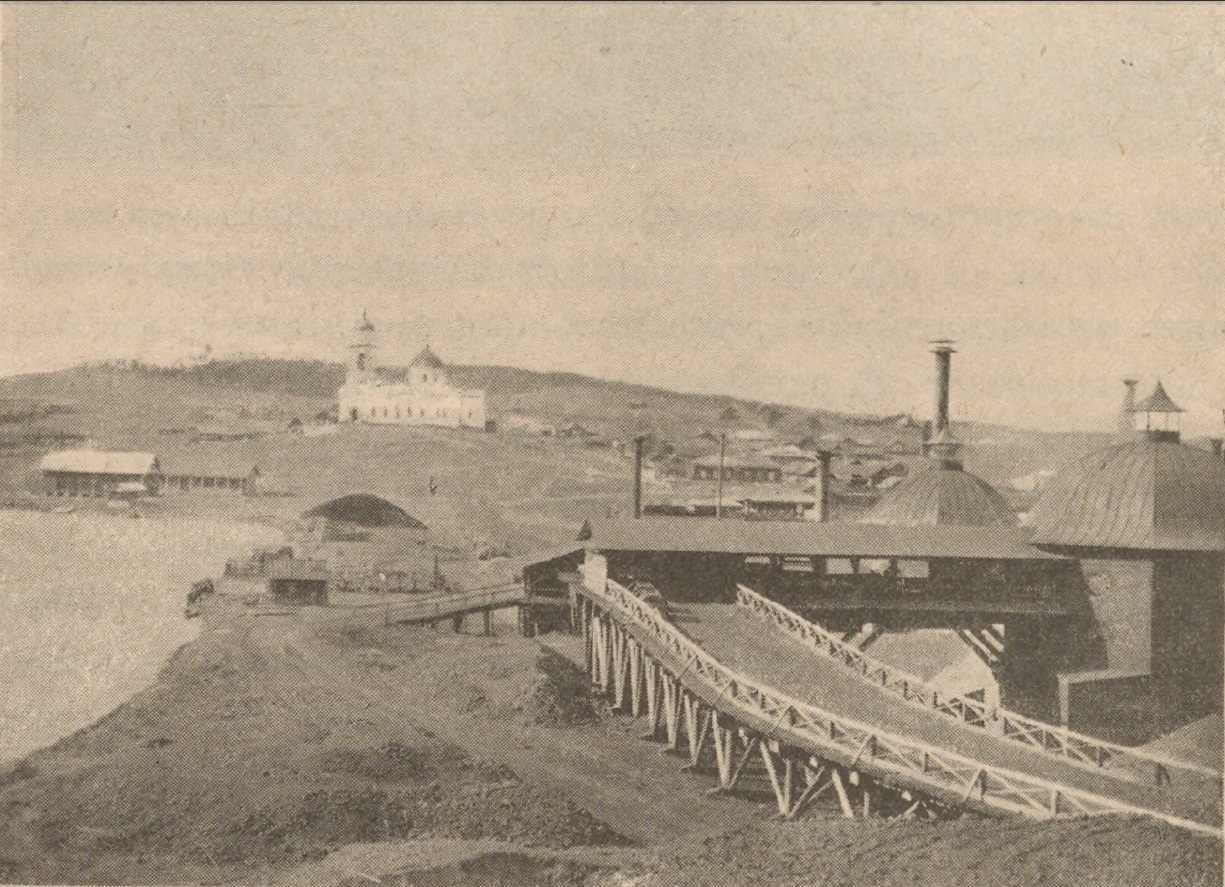
The 1886 photograph.

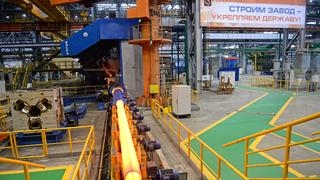
The 2014 photograph.

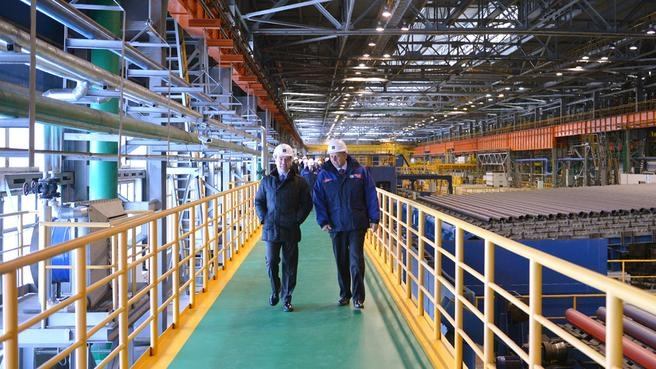
Dmitry Medvedev visits the plant in 2014.

The Venus symbol (♀) of the Polevskoy Copper Smelting Plant and the eight-pointed star of the Seversky Plant on the Polevskoy coat of arms.
