= Polevskoy Copper Smelting Plant =

Russian steel factory. Active 1724-1930

The Venus symbol (♀) of the Polevskoy Copper Smelting Plant and the eight-pointed star of the Seversky Pipe Plant on the Polevskoy coat of arms.

The Polevskoy Copper Smelting Plant (Russian: Полевской медеплавильный завод, romanized: Polevskoj medeplavilnyj zavod), also known as Polevaya or Poleva, was one of the major metallurgical facilities located in Polevskoy, in Sverdlovsk Oblast of Russia.

== History ==
It was established by the decree of Peter the Great to process the local copper deposits. The Polevskoy Plant was named after the local river Polevaya. The plant became the basis for the settlement which later grew into the town of Polevskoy.

The place for a new plant was chosen by Vasily Tatishchev. Georg Wilhelm de Gennin was in charge of the construction. The Plant became active in 1724. The copper was branded with the symbol of the Roman goddess Venus. The Venus symbol (♀), which represents copper as a chemical element, is now displayed in the Polevskoy town coat of arms.

In 1757 the Polevskoy Plant was purchased by the Ural merchant Alexei Turchaninov along with the Seversky Pipe Plant. Along with the Seversky and Sysertsky Plants, the Polevskoy Plant represented the Sysert Mining District. It was extremely profitable. Turchaninov's descendants managed the plant til 1912. For a long time the main ore supplier for the plant was the Gumyoshevsky mine, called "The Copper Mountain" by the local populace. However in the 19th century the Gumyoshevsky mine was exhausted. After it was shut down in 1870, the Polevskoy Copper Smelting Plant was reorganized to the iron plant. In this capacity the plant stayed active until 1923, but then shut down due to the lack of prospects.

== See also ==
- Sverdlovsk Oblast
- Ural mountains
- Dumnaya mountain
