= Central Ural Publishing House =

Russian book publisher

Central Ural Publishing House Средне-Уральское книжное издательство
- Founded: 1920
- Country of origin: Yekaterinburg, Russia
- Official website: http://knizhnoeizdatelstvo.ru/

The Central Ural Publishing House (Russian: Средне-Уральское книжное издательство, romanized: Sredne-Uralskoe knizhnoe izdatelstvo), formerly the Sverdlovsk Publishing House (Russian: Свердловское книжное издательство, romanized: Sverdlovskoe knizhnoe izdatelstvo), was a Soviet and Russian book publisher head-quartered in Yekaterinburg. It was established in 1920. In 1930–40, it was the largest book publisher in the Ural region.

== History ==
The company was established in 1920. It was initially called Uralgosizdat (Russian: Уралгосиздат, Уральское областное отделение Государственного издательства, romanized: Uralskoe oblastnoe otdelenie Gosudarstvennogo izdatelstva, lit. "The Ural department of the State publisher"). It published propaganda brochures, posters, leaflets, the first alphabet book for adults in the Soviet Union. In 1922, it was transformed into the joint-stock company Uralkniga (Уралкнига). Bella Kun became the chairman of the board. In 1934, it was renamed to the Sverdlovsk Publishing House, abbreviated as Sverdlgiz (Russian: Свердлгиз, Свердловское областное государственное издательство, romanized: Sverdlovskoe oblastnoe gosudarstvennoe izdatelstvo).

In 1963, it was rebranded as the Central Ural Publishing House, with the State Committee for Publishing taking over. The Tyumen department was opened. It was active till late-1990s. The number of published titles gradually decreased through the years, e.g. 104 books were released in 1979, but only 26 in 1997.

== Publications ==
- Boyevye Rebyata (children's almanac)
- Uralsky Sovremennik
- Uralsky Sledopyt (magazine)

== Notable employees ==
- Bazhov Pavel Petrovich – Russian writer and publicist;
- Khorinskaya Elena Evgenievna – Soviet and Russian poet, writer, translator;
- Salinsky Afanasy Dmitrievich – Russian Soviet playwright;
- Kun Bela – journalist, Hungarian communist revolutionary and politician.
