= Pavel Bazhov =

Russian writer and publicist

- Павел Бажов
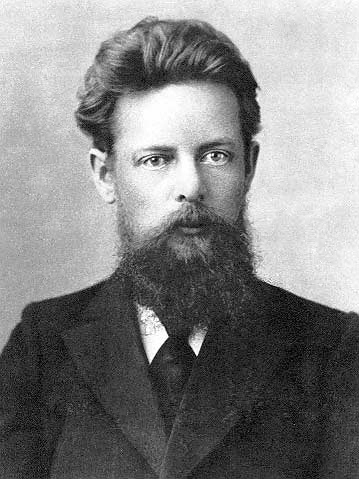
- Born: Pavel Petrovich Bazhov; 27 January 1879; Sysert, Yekaterinburgsky Uyezd, Perm Governorate, Russian Empire
- Died: 3 December 1950 (aged 71); Moscow, Soviet Union
- Writing career
- Notable work: The Malachite Box

Pavel Petrovich Bazhov (Russian: Па́вел Петро́вич Бажо́в; 27 January 1879 – 3 December 1950) was a Russian writer and publicist.

Bazhov is best known for his collection of fairy tales The Malachite Box, based on Ural folklore and published in the Soviet Union in 1939. In 1944, a translation of the collection into English was published in New York City and London. Later Sergei Prokofiev created the ballet The Tale of the Stone Flower based on one of the tales. Bazhov was also the author of several books on the Russian Revolution and the Civil War. Yegor Gaidar, who served as Prime Minister of Russia, was his grandson.

== Early life ==
Bazhov was born in Sysert, a town in the Urals. His father Pyotr Bazhov was the master of the welding shop of the Sysert Steel Plant. His family, like most in factory towns, struggled to make ends meet and had virtually no political power in Czarist Russia. From these beginnings, Bazhov found a calling in public service. Between 1889 and 1893 he studied in a religious school in Yekaterinburg. He took part in many protests, the most famous one resulting in him receiving a note of political disloyalty from his reactionary teacher on his certificate. The city made a huge impression on him, and he would return to live there many years later. In 1899, Bazhov graduated third in his class from Perm Theological Seminary, where Alexander Stepanovich Popov and D.N. Mamin previously studied. He dreamt of attending Tomsk Seminary University, but was rejected.

Instead, he worked temporarily as a Russian language teacher, first in Yekaterinburg, then later in Kamyshlov. From 1907 to 1914 Bazhov worked at the Women’s Diocesan College teaching Russian language. During this time he met and married Valentina Ivanitsky, a graduate from the Diocesan School. She was his muse for many of his poems about love and happiness.

== Career ==
When the First World War began, Bazhov had two daughters. He was a member of the Socialist-Revolutionary Party until 1917. In 1918, he joined the Bolshevik Party, volunteered for the Red Army, and was deployed into military actions in the Ural frontline. In the autumn of 1920, Bazhov moved to Semipalatinsk and was elected a member of the Party Committee of that province. He was instructed to lead the provincial council of trade unions, but often served assignments that went beyond his office. From 1923 to 1929 he lived in Yekaterinburg and worked in the editorial board of the Krestianskaya (Peasants) Newspaper, as well as contributing his essays on old factory life conditions and the civil war throughout 1924. In that year, Bazhov published his first book, Urals Tales (Уральские были) on the images of life in the Urals during the 1880-1890s. It was also during this period that he wrote over forty tales on themes of Ural factory folklore that contributed to his collection, The Malachite Box. Publication of Bazhov's most famous work – the collection of fairy tales - earned Bazhov the State Prize. Later on Bazhov supplemented the book with new tales.

Bazhov had every reason to speak with pride about his activities between 1917 and 1920. D.A. Kuhn named Bazhov in the report on the 60th anniversary of the Kazakh Soviet Socialist Republic and the Communist Party of Kazakhstan among those wonderful people, "who in the years of revolution and civil war, with a rifle, a plow, or a book, claimed a life on the Kazakh space, with high international quality, resilience, courage and heroism". From these actions, he was decorated with an Order of Lenin and won the USSR State Prize.

During the Second World War Bazhov worked with both Yekaterinburg writers and those already evacuated from different corners of the Soviet Union. After the war his eyesight started weakening dramatically, but he went on his editing work, as well as collecting and creatively adapting local folklore.

In 1946 he was elected to the Supreme Soviet.

== Death ==
Bazhov died in 1950 in Moscow and was laid to rest in his home, Yekaterinburg.

== Legacy ==
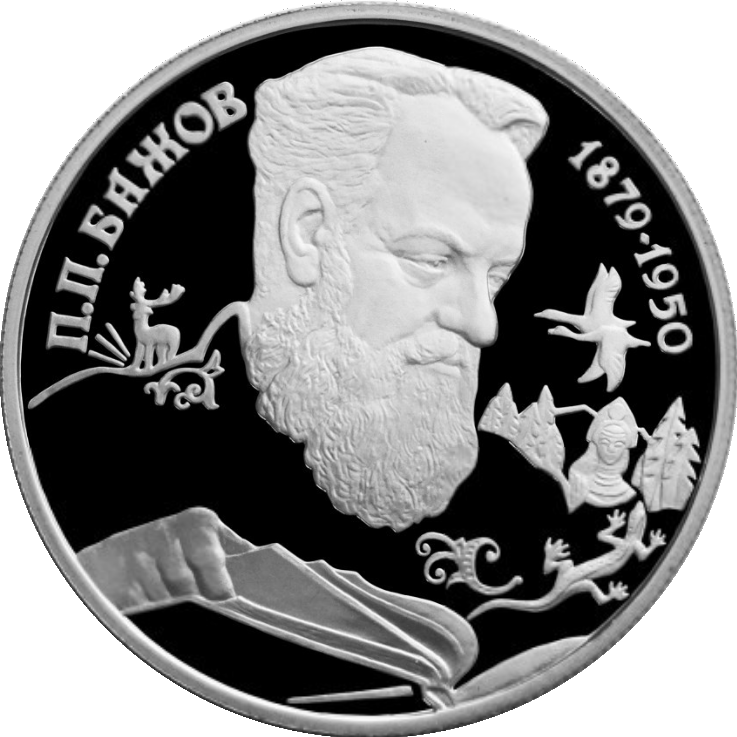
Commemorative coin featuring Bazhov.

In 1968 Sverdlovsk Film Studio released a docufiction feature film Tales of the Ural Mountains (Russian: Сказы уральских гор, romanized: Skazy uralskikh gor) about the work of Bazhov. The film, directed by Olgerd Vorontsov, was created for the 90th anniversary since the birth of the writer. It combined information about the conception and creation of Bazhov's stories with acted scenes from his tales. It also had information about some popular characters such as the Fire-Fairy. The film was narrated by Yevgeny Vesnik, but also contained the unique recordings of Pavel Bazhov's voice.

A documentary film Pavel Petrovich Bazhov. A remembrance documentary film (Russian: Павел Петрович Бажов. Фильм-воспоминание, romanized: Pavel Petrovich Bazhov. Film-vospominanie) was made in 1979 by the same studio. It was directed by Liya Kozyreva.

Another documentary The Soviet skaz of Pavel Bazhov (Russian: Советский сказ Павла Бажова, romanized: Sovetskij skaz Pavla Bazhova), directed by Yury Malyugin, was released by Russia-K in 2010.

On October 6, 2021, a monument to the writer Bazhov was erected in the Sverdlovsk Oblast in the city of Kamyshlov, this is the largest monument to the writer in Russia. It is made of bronze, marble and granite, its height is more than three meters.
