= Russian ballet =

Characteristics of Russian ballet

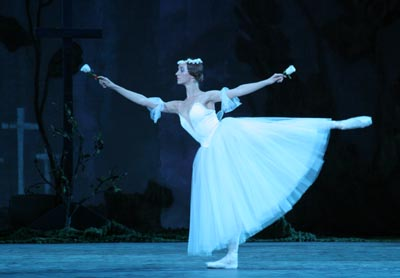
A performance of Giselle, ou Les Wilis

Russian ballet (Russian: Русский балет) (French: Ballet russe) is a form of ballet characteristic of or originating from Russia.

== Imperial Russian ballet ==
Ballet had already dawned in Russia long before start of the 17th century as per the previous publications by certain authors. In this respect Anna Kuchta posits that ballet was first performed in Russia around 1673. While the first recorded ballet performance is believed to be in the 16th century around 1581, the Tsarist control and isolationism in Russia allowed for little influence from the West. It was not until the rise of Peter the Great that Russian society opened up to the West. St. Petersburg was erected to embrace the West and compete against Moscow's isolationism. Peter the Great created a new Russia which rivaled the society of the West with magnificent courts and palaces. His vision was to challenge the west. Classical ballet entered the realm of Russia not as entertainment, but as a "standard of physical comportment to be emulated and internalized – an idealized way of behaving." The aim was not to entertain the masses of Russians, but to cultivate new Russian people.

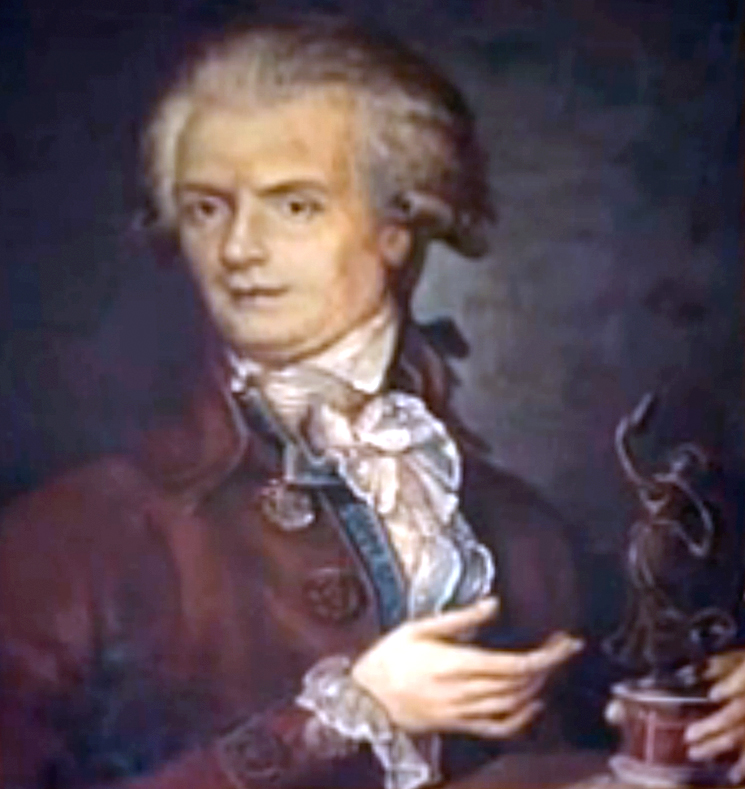
Jean-Baptiste Landé founded Russian ballet.

Empress Anna (1730–1740) was devoted to ostentatious amusements (balls, fireworks, tableaux), and in the summer of 1734 ordered the appointment of Jean-Baptiste Landé as dancing master in the military academy she had founded in 1731 for sons of the nobility. In 1738, he became ballet master and head of the new ballet school, launching the advanced study of ballet in Russia, and winning the patronage of elite families. France provided many leaders such as Charles Didelot in St. Petersburg (1801–1831), Jules Perrot (1848–1859) and Arthur Saint-Léon (1859–1869).

In the early 19th century, the theaters were opened up to anyone who could afford a ticket. A seating section called a rayok, or 'paradise gallery', consisted of simple wooden benches. This allowed non-wealthy people access to the ballet, because tickets in this section were inexpensive.

One author describes the Imperial ballet as "unlike that of any other country in the world ..." The most prestigious of the ballet troupes were those attached to the state-supported theatres. The directors of these companies were personally appointed by the tsar, and all the dancers were, in a sense, Imperial servants. In the theatre, the men in the audience always remained standing until the tsar entered his box and, out of respect, after the performance, they remained in their places until he had departed. Curtain calls were arranged according to a strict pattern: first, the ballerina bowed to the tsar's box, then to that of the theater director, and finally to the general public.

== Influence of Russian ballet on global dance culture ==
The influence of Russian ballet extends far beyond its national borders, significantly shaping global dance culture. With the establishment of prestigious ballet companies such as the Ballets Russes in the early 20th century, Russian ballet introduced innovative choreography and performance techniques to international audiences. This influence was particularly notable in Paris, where the Ballets Russes captivated the public and inspired a new generation of dancers and choreographers. Russian ballet's emphasis on technical precision, expressive movement, and dramatic storytelling has become a cornerstone of classical ballet training worldwide.

== Ballets Russes ==
By the early 1900s, the Russian ballet went beyond its borders and infiltrated Paris. It had become its own force and was distinctly Russian, while still being embraced by the Parisian society. In 1903 Ivan Clustine, a Russian dancer and choreographer who had started his career at the Bolshoi Theatre, was appointed Maître de ballet at the Paris Opera. Clustine's hiring promoted a frenzy of questions about his nationality and choreographic agenda: "His hiring was thought a direct attempt by the Opera to imitate the Russian company; even he thought as much, maintaining, not without despondency, that inspiration too often came from the north: 'A revolution! A method that people often apply in the country of the tsars.' Clustine, although acknowledging his nationality with pride, harbored none of the revolutionary intentions that some thought an inevitable consequence of being Russian."

The Parisians, while denying adoption of the backwards Russian troupe, had distinct Russian influence in their theater. "Despite Clustine's protestations, several features of the Opera's post-1909 ballets, along with its institutional conventions and balletic policy, appeared to betray a Russian influence." The stigma of Russian brutality and force was applied even in Paris. While their style was not only being accepted in Paris, but implemented in Paris theaters, the Ballets Russes were still considered dangerous, even in the theatre of performing art. "The Ballets Russes, at base, became a metaphor for invasion, an eternal force that could engulf and control, could penetrate the membrane of French society, culture and even art itself." The embracing of Russian ballet in the Paris society became a point of contention and French nationalism collided with Russian determination. Questions arose about the Russian intention in the Paris theaters under the title "cultural politics" including "the delimitation of boundaries, the preservation of identity and the nature of relational engagements."

== Impact of the Ballets Russes ==
As early as the 1900s, the Russian ballet had ventured beyond its domestic sphere and enthralled spectators in Paris, an important development. To cement Russian influence in Paris, Ivan Clustine, a Russian dancer, and choreographer originally from the Bolshoi Theatre was appointed as the Paris Opera's Maître de ballet in 1903. When Clustine was appointed, more doubts concerning his nationality and its influence on his creativity arose due to many people's view of Clustine's appointment as the Paris Opera's attempt to establish a ballet company following the model of the Russian ballet company. However, Clustine professed pride in his nationality and there are apparent carry-overs of the Russian influence in the productions of the Opera post 1909 and a few organisational structures. While the society of Paris fought against the incursion of what was referred to as 'Russian ballet', it is possible to argue that though to a certain extent, the French theater culture embraced some ideas of Russian spirit and many aspects of the so-called 'Russian ballet'.

== Ballet companies ==
The first ballet company was the Imperial School of Ballet in St. Petersburg in the 1740s. Sergey Diaghilev (1872–1929), an enormously important figure in the Russian ballet scene, founded the ballet company Ballets Russes in 1909. Diaghilev intervened in every aspect of ballet – direction, production, lighting, scenery, and performance. He headquartered his ballet company in Paris. A protégé of Diaghilev, George Balanchine, founded the New York City Ballet in 1948. Today, the Kirov Ballet company (now known as the Mariinsky Ballet) and the Bolshoi company are two world-renowned Russian ballet companies that tour the world.

- Mariinsky Ballet (formerly Kirov ballet)
- Bolshoi Ballet

Other Russian ballet companies include:

- Ballets Russes, founded in 1909
- Moscow State Academy of Choreography, commonly known as The Bolshoi Ballet Academy, founded in 1773
- Vaganova Academy of Russian Ballet, founded in 1738 as the Imperial Ballet School
- Saint Petersburg Eifman Ballet, founded in 1977
- Mikhailovsky Theatre Ballet, founded in the 1830s
- Perm Theatre Ballet, founded in 1896
- Novosibirsk Theatre Ballet, founded in 1945
- Russian State Ballet of Siberia, founded in 1978

A number of companies have been called, or included in their name, Moscow Ballet.

== Methods ==
Several methods exist in Russian ballet. The most widely used is the Vaganova method, named after the ballerina and teacher Agrippina Vaganova.

== Notable dancers ==
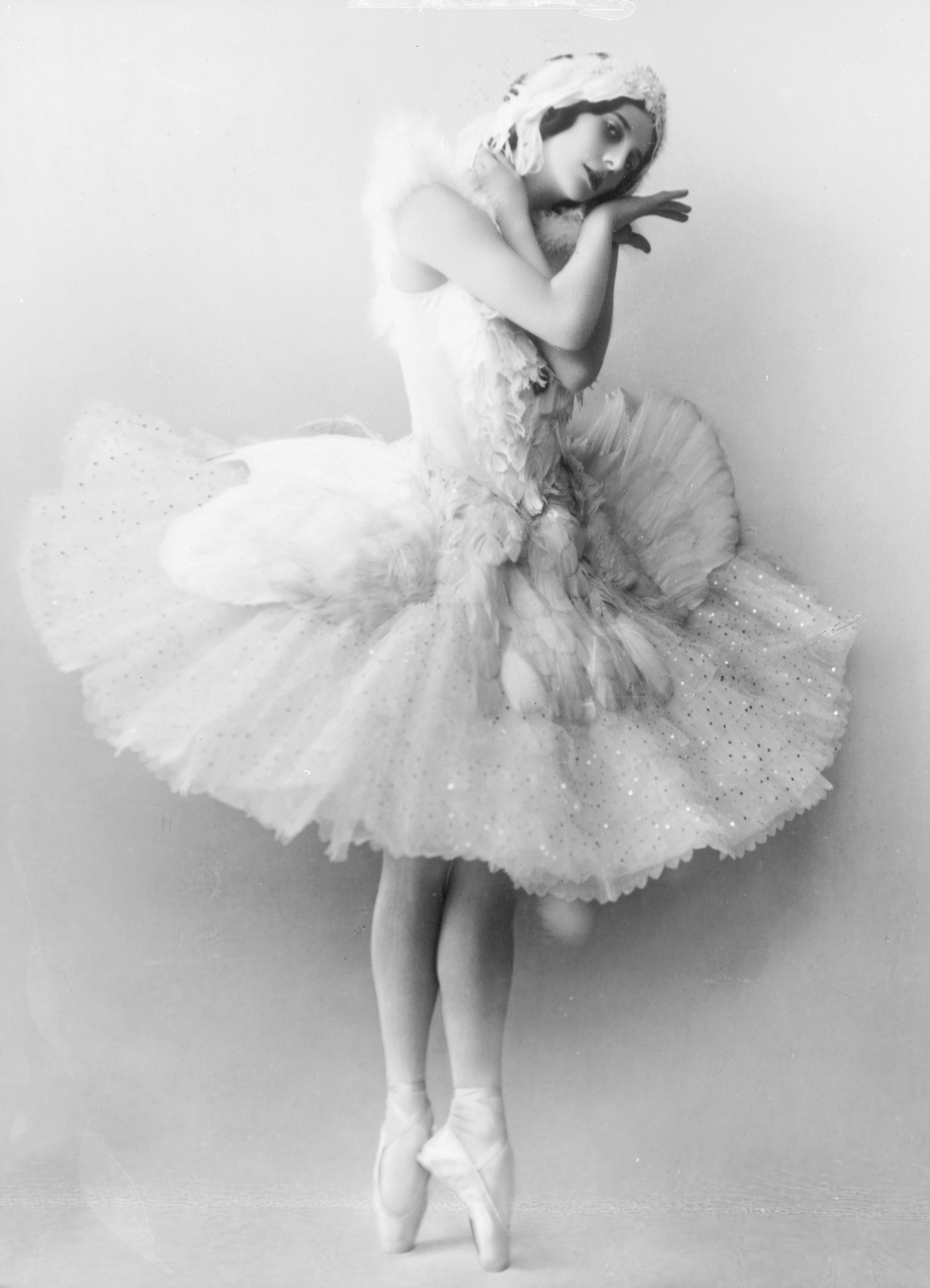
Anna Pavlova, one of the most celebrated dancers of her time

Many dancers in the style of Russian ballet have gone on to reach worldwide acclaim. Notable dancers include:

- Altynai Asylmuratova
- Mikhail Baryshnikov
- Natalia Bessmertnova
- Vakhtang Chabukiani
- Natalia Dudinskaya
- Nikolai Fadeyechev
- Michel Fokine
- Yekaterina Geltzer
- Pavel Gerdt
- Elizaveta Gerdt
- Alexander Gorsky
- Alexander Godunov
- Tamara Karsavina
- Ekaterina Kondaurova
- Ekaterina Krysanova
- Nikolai Legat
- Sergei Legat
- Olga Lepeshinskaya
- Larissa Lezhnina
- Maris Liepa
- Mikhail Lobukhin
- Ulyana Lopatkina
- Lydia Lopokova
- Natalia Makarova
- Vladimir Malakhov
- Léonide Massine
- Ekaterina Maximova
- Galina Mezentseva
- Mikhail Mordkin
- Irek Mukhamedov
- Vaslav Nijinsky
- Cleo Nordi
- Olesya Novikova
- Rudolf Nureyev
- Evgenia Obraztsova
- Alla Osipenko
- Natalia Osipova
- Veronika Part
- Anna Pavlova
- Maya Plisetskaya
- Olga Preobrajenska
- Farukh Ruzimatov
- Leonid Sarafanov
- Marina Semyonova
- Polina Semionova
- Konstantin Sergeyev
- Alla Shelest
- Vladimir Shklyarov
- Alla Sizova
- Olga Smirnova
- Alina Somova
- Olga Spesivtseva
- Yulia Stepanova
- Vasily Tikhomirov
- Vera Trefilova
- Galina Ulanova
- Agrippina Vaganova
- Ivan Vasiliev
- Vladimir Vasiliev
- Ekaterina Vazem
- Diana Vishneva
- Pierre Vladimiroff

== Notable Russian ballets ==
- The Pharaoh's Daughter (1862)
- The Little Humpbacked Horse (1864)
- Le Roi Candaule (1868)
- Don Quixote (1869)
- La Bayadère (1877)
- The Sleeping Beauty (ballet) (1890)
- The Nutcracker (1892)
- The Awakening of Flora (1894)
- Swan Lake (1895)
- Raymonda (1898)
- Harlequinade (1900)
- The Firebird (1910)
- Romeo and Juliet (1940)
- Cinderella (1945)

== See also ==
- Bolshoi Ballet
- Glossary of ballet terms
- List of the main ballet masters of the Saint Petersburg State Ballet
- Mariinsky Ballet
- Vaganova method

== Bibliography ==
- Anderson, Jack. (1992). Ballet and Modern Dance: A Concise History. New Jersey: Princeton Book Company.
- Andre, Paul; Arkadyev, V. (1999) Great History of Russian Ballet: Its Art & Choreography (1999).
- Caddy, Davinia. (2012). The Ballets Russes and Beyond: Music and Dance in Belle-Epoque Paris. Cambridge: Cambridge University Press.
- Cross, Samuel H. (1944) "The Russian Ballet Before Dyagilev." Slavonic and East European Review. American Series 3.4 (1944): 19-49. in JSTOR
- Curtis, Glenn E, ed. (1996). Russia: A Country Study. Washington: GPO for the Library of Congress.
- Homans, Jennifer, (2010). Apollo's Angels: A History of Ballet. New York: Random House.
- Johnson, Alfred Edwin. (1913) The Russian Ballet (Houghton Mifflin) online
- Lifar, Serge. (1954). A history of Russian ballet from its origins to the present day (Hutchinson)
- Lobenthal, Joel. (2016) Alla Osipenko: Beauty and Resistance in Soviet Ballet (Oxford University Press)
- Norton, Leslie. (2004) Léonide Massine and the 20th century ballet (McFarland)
- Propert, Walter Archibald. (1972) The Russian Ballet in Western Europe, 1909–1920. B. Blom
- Roslavleva, Natalia. (1966). Era of the Russian Ballet, New York: E.P. Dutton & Co., Inc.
- Surit͡s, E. I͡A, and E. I︠A︡ Surit︠s︡. (1990) Soviet Choreographers in the 1920s (Duke University Press, 1990).
- Wiley, Roland John. (1990) A century of Russian ballet: documents and accounts, 1810-1910 (Oxford University Press)
- Willis-Aarino, Peggy. (2002). Agrippina Vaganova (1879–1951): Her Place in the History of Ballet and Her Impact on the Future of Classical Dance, Lewiston, New York: Edwin Mellen Press.
