= Stars of the Russian Ballet =

1953 film

- Film poster
- Directed by: Gerbert Rappaport
- Starring: Galina Ulanova; Konstantin Sergeyev; Natalya Dudinskaya
- Cinematography: Semyon Ivanov
- Edited by: M. Bernatsky; D. Lander
- Release date: 1953
- Running time: 80 minutes
- Country: Soviet Union
- Language: Russian

Stars of the Russian Ballet (Russian: Мастера русского балета, romanized: Mastera russkogo baleta) is a 1953 Soviet ballet film trilogy, featuring abridged versions of Swan Lake, The Fountain of Bakhchisarai and Flames of Paris. The film headlined world-renowned ballerinas Maya Plisetskaya and Galina Ulanova, and was directed by Gerbert Rappaport. It was entered into the 1954 Cannes Film Festival.

== Cast ==
- Galina Ulanova as Maria (segment "The Fountain of Bakhchisarai")
- Konstantin Sergeyev as Prince Siegfried (segment "Swan Lake")
- Natalya Dudinskaya as Odile, the black swan (segment "Swan Lake")
- V. Bakanov as Rothbart (segment "Swan Lake")
- Pyotr Gussyev as Girai (segment "The Fountain of Bakhchisarai")
- Maya Plisetskaya as Zarema (segment "The Fountain of Bakhchisarai")
- Yuri Zhdanov as Vacelev (segment "The Fountain of Bakhchisarai")
- Vakhtang Chabukiani as Philippe (segment "The Flames of Paris")
- Muza Gotlib as Jeanne (segment "The Flames of Paris")
