= Class of perfection =

Advanced ballet class

The class of perfection (French: classe de perfectionnement) is an advanced ballet class for the highest ranking ballerinas in a ballet company. In Russia, the traditional class of perfection has been replaced by the unified company class, but the term may still be used informally for the special classes taken by only the highest ranking dancers in a company.

== Early history ==
The class of perfection at the Imperial Choreographic School was taught by Christian Johansson, who had himself been a pupil of Danish balletmaster August Bournonville. After Johansson, the responsibility of teaching the class passed to his former student Nikolai Legat. Many of Russian ballets legendary dancers were once pupils of Legat's class of perfection including Njinsky, Mikhail Fokine and the most important ballerinas of the time. Ballet mistress Agrippina Vaganova had also been one of Legat's class of perfection students.

== Teachers ==
Name	Date	Notable pupils	Reference
Christian Johansson		Nikolai Legat	
Nikolai Legat	1889	Njinsky, Fokine, Vaganova, Alexandra Danilova	
Agrippina Vaganova	c.1925-1951	Natalia Dudinskaya	
Natalia Dudinskaya		1951	
