= Mikhail Dudko =

Russian Soviet ballet dancer

- Михаил Андреевич Дудко
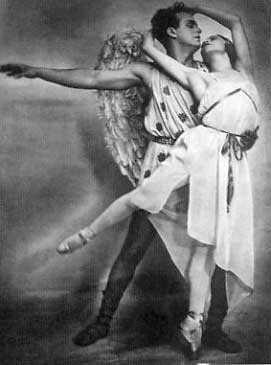
- Mikhail Dudko and Galina Ulanova in "Eros" ballet, 1923
- Born: Mikhail Andreyevich Dudko; Saint Petersburg, Russian Empire
- Died: 11 September 1981 (aged 78); Leningrad, Soviet Union
- Occupation: Ballet dancer
- Years active: 1920–1940, 1953–1981

Mikhail Andreyevich Dudko (Russian: Михаил Андреевич Дудко; 31 December [O.S. 18 December] 1902 – 11 September 1981) was a Russian Soviet ballet dancer.

== Training ==
Mikhail Dudko was accepted into the Imperial theatre school at the St. Petersburg Imperial troupe. His teachers were Samuil Andrianov, Viktor Semyonov (teacher and first husband of Marina Semyonova), and Leonid Leontyev. He showed his outstanding talent and was considered a future star of ballet. During an exam, he danced with a student, Lidya Ivanova, a performance that was so successful that all the teachers believed them both to have great ballet careers ahead of them. The lives of both, however, were tragic.

Lidya Ivanova first became famous for her roles in small ballet. Portraits of her would be painted by famous artists, including several by Zinaida Serebriakova. Poets including Mikhail Kuzmin devoted poems to her, the Russian writer Konstantin Vaginov, even making her the prototype of his heroine. She would later drown in the Gulf of Finland, on 16 June 1924.

During the revolution in 1917, Mikhail Dudko was a student. The Imperial theatre school where he was studying became the Soviet school, although the rules and teachers still remained the same. In 1920 he finished his studies and was admitted to the Leningrad theater of opera and ballet, formerly known as the Mariinsky Ballet.

== Performances ==
For twenty years, he performed in many ballet roles, including:

- Khan's Servant — The Little Humpbacked Horse
- Jean de Brienne and Abderahman — Raymonda
- Young Marquis and Actor – Flames of Paris
- Eros — Eros
- Prince — Swan Lake
- Prince — The Nutcracker
- Basilio — Don Quixote
- Prince Désiré — The Sleeping Beauty
- Young man — Les Sylphides
- Claude Frollo and Phoebus — La Esmeralda
- Albert — Giselle
- Conrad — Le Corsaire
- Khan Girey — The Fountain of Bakhchisarai
- Paris — Romeo and Juliet
- Soviet Captain — The Red Poppy
- Ivan Tsarévitch — The Firebird
- Gyges — Tsar Kandavl or Le Roi Candaule
- Ta-Hor — The Pharaoh's Daughter
- Damis — Les Ruses d'Amour
- Solor — La Bayadère
- Lucien d'Hervilly — Paquita
- Taras Bulba — Taras Bulba
- Commander — Laurencia

== Discredit ==
After the start of World War II, in the summer of 1941, Dudko fled Leningrad and Nazi occupation for the countryside. In the same area, there was another famous actor and opera singer, Nikolay Pechkovskiy (ru: Николай Константинович Печковский). There were also several other actors present. The Germans decided to force them all to join the theatre company of the town, Gatchina, and the actors agreed because they had nowhere else to go. They continued putting on plays and earned money for their performances.

The war ended after five years, but the Soviet government issued a decree that all those who had collaborated with the fascists were to be considered traitors. A lot of people were executed under this law, and the performers were considered as criminals. Mikhail Dudko and Nikolay Pechkovskiy were not executed, but they were imprisoned in Gulag camps for 8 years.

In connection with the arrest of Mikhail Dudko, all his achievements in Soviet ballet were immediately taken away by the government. Soviet dictionaries and encyclopedias stated that Mikhail Dudko had been a bad dancer and had performed the main roles solely because of his beautiful appearance, not because of his ballet professionalism. Even in modern times, the encyclopedia "Russian ballet" declares: An acute shortage of soloists in the 1920s helped to Dudko quickly occupy the position of the stars of ballet, performer of the leading parties of almost all classical and contemporary repertoire. Dudko was not remarkable virtuoso dance technique, but he possessed an extremely effective scenic appearance and nobility of style, played a worthy partner of the ballerinas (ru: «Острая нехватка солистов в 1920-е гг. помогла Д. быстро занять положение премьера, исполнителя ведущих партий практически всего классич. и совр. репертуара. Д. не отличался виртуозной танц. техникой, но обладал чрезвычайно эффектной сценич. внешностью, благородством манер, выступал достойным партнером балерин»). Less biased sources consider Dudko to be among the first ballet dancers of his time, mentioning his lyricism, the sculpturing of his poses, and the noble manner of his dance - all characteristics of the so-called French school of dance. Famous Russian choreographer and ballet dancer Rostislav Zakharov also highly praised the virtuoso technique of Mikhail Dudko.

Mikhail Dudko was released from prison in 1953, but he did not receive permission to return to Leningrad. He worked in provincial theatres of Ufa, Novosibirsk, Tbilisi, dancing for small roles. During this period he only had one serious role. Vakhtang Chabukiani invited M.Dudko in 1960 to participate in his film Othello, in the role of Brabantio.

Only at the end of his life was Mikhail Dudko allowed to move back to his native city. However, he could not return to the profession of a ballet dancer because of his age. Mikhail Andreyevich Dudko died on 11 September 1981 in Leningrad, at the age of 78.
