= Alla Shelest =

Russian ballerina, choreographer and dance director

Alla Yakovlevna Shelest (Russian: Алла Яковлевна Шелест; 26 February 1919 – 7 December 1998) was a Russian ballerina, choreographer and dance director, "a star of the Kirov Ballet during the Forties and Fifties".

== Life and work ==
Shelest was born in Smolensk, Russia and accepted to the Leningrad Choreographic Institute (now known as the Vaganova Academy). Her early training was by Elizaveta Gerdt but when she was older, she studied with Agrippina Vaganova. After her graduation in 1937 (where she made a huge impact dancing in the ballet Katerina by Leonid Lavrovsky), she was accepted into the Kirov Ballet and started dancing lead soloist roles almost immediately. She became known as a consummate dramatic ballerina.

During World War II, to escape the Nazi siege of Leningrad, much of the Kirov Ballet, including Shelest, left for Perm in 1942. There she danced many of her leading roles for the first time, including her first Aurora in The Sleeping Beauty, Street Dancer in Don Quixote, and one of her greatest roles, the fiery Zarema in The Fountain of Bakhchisarai. In all these roles, she was greatly influenced by the dramatic theories of Stanislasky and acclaimed for introducing a form of realistic acting to the ballet stage.

After the war, Shelest was also at the forefront of the developments in Russian dance. She performed in the new works by Zakharov, Bourmeister, Sergeyev, and Yakobson, having an incredible success in 1956 as Aegina in Yakobson's Spartacus due her innate sense of drama and character development. Her first Giselle in the same year broke new ground in offering a more realistic approach to the drama and was considered a revelation at the time.

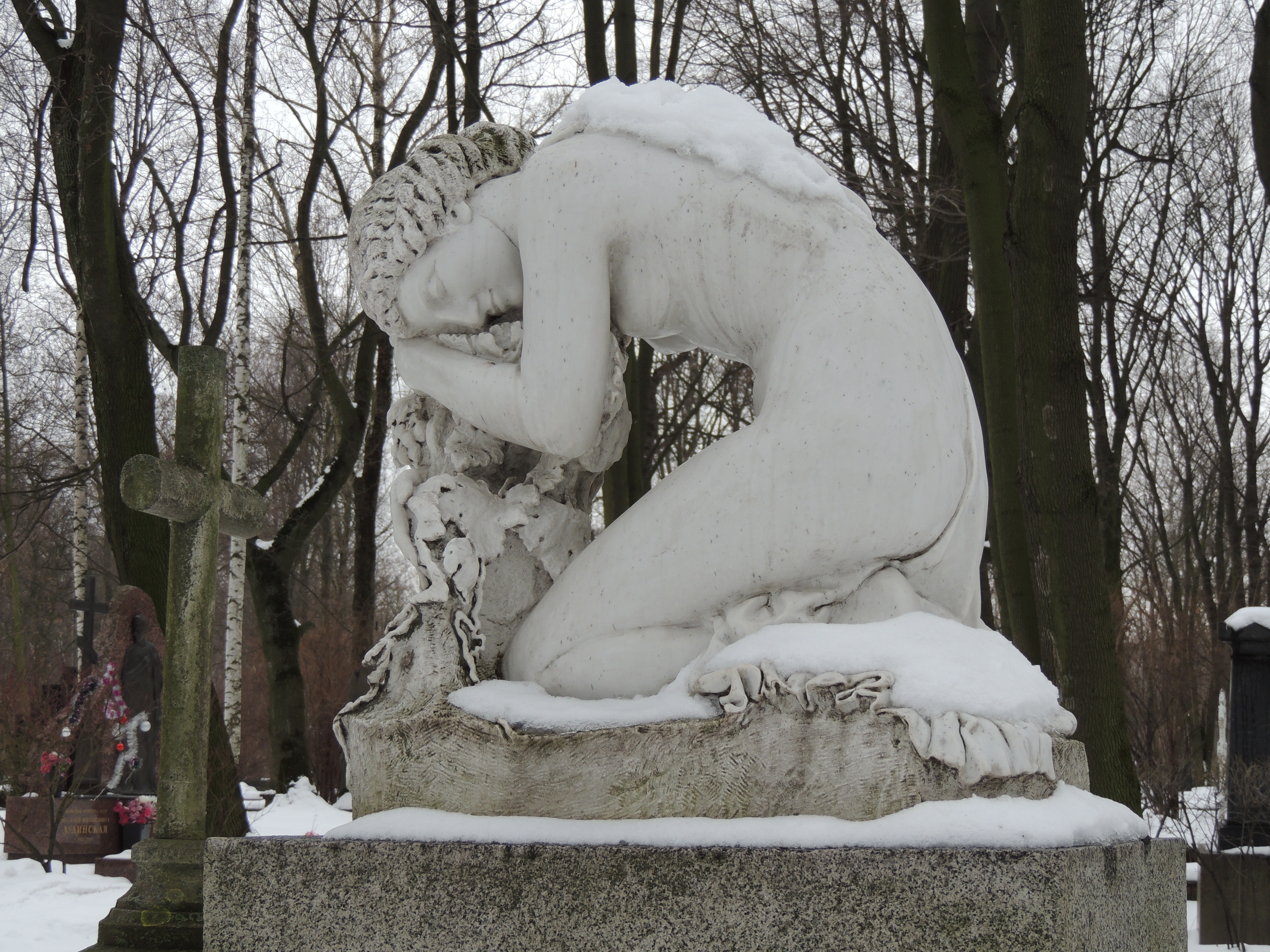
Tombstone in St. Petersburg

In the 1950s, she married choreographer Yuri Grigorovich and danced in many of his creations, both Katerina and Mistress of the Copper Mountain in The Stone Flower, and also Mekhmene Banu in The Legend of Love, which was later to be her farewell performance, 26 years to the day after her graduation. They later divorced and Grigorovich went on to marry Bolshoi ballerina Natalia Bessmertnova. Shelest made relatively few foreign tours but, in 1953, she was allowed to perform in England with a small troupe of dancers. She created a sensation during her five-week stay, but didn't leave the Iron Curtain countries for the rest of her career. She was, however, allowed to visit Finland, and direct Swan Lake for the Finnish National Opera in spring 1976.

Shelest was often described as having a "stage feud" with Kirov star ballerina, Natalia Dudinskaya which often impacted her standing in the company especially when Dudinskaya's husband, Konstantin Sergeyev, was the Artistic Director. Shelest had a profound impact on many Soviet ballerinas of the 1950s-70s including Maya Plisetskaya, who considered her the greatest dancer she had ever seen. In 1953 she became an Honored Artist of the USSR and, in 1957, a Peoples' Artist. After a retirement and a post-dancing career as a choreographer, regional company director and instructor at the Vaganova Academy, Shelest died in Saint Petersburg on 7 December 1998.
