= Vakhtang Chabukiani =

Georgian ballet dancer, teacher and choreographer (1910–1992)

- ვახტანგ ჭაბუკიანი
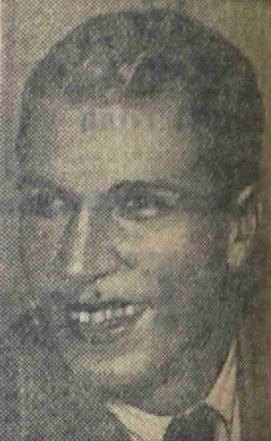
- Born: March 12, 1910; Tiflis, Russian Empire
- Died: April 6, 1992 (aged 82); Tbilisi, Georgia
- Occupations: Ballet dancer, choreographer, teacher

Vakhtang Mikheilis dze Chabukiani (Note: Georgian: ვახტანგ მიხეილის ძე ჭაბუკიანი, romanized: Vakht'ang Mikheilis dze Ch'abuk'iani; Russian: Вахтанг Михайлович Чабукиани, romanized: Vakhtang Mikhaylovich Chabukiani) (March 12, 1910 – April 6, 1992) was a Soviet and Georgian ballet dancer, choreographer and teacher. He is considered to be one of the most influential male ballet dancers of the 20th century, and is noted for creating the choreography of several of the most famous male variations of the classical ballet repertory, for example in Le Corsaire, La Bayadère, and Swan Lake.

He is also noted for his and Vladimir Ponomaryov's 1941 revival of La Bayadère for the Kirov Ballet, which is still retained in the company's repertory and has served as the basis for many subsequent productions in Russia and abroad.

== Early life and career ==
Born in Tbilisi to a Georgian father and a Latvian mother, Chabukiani graduated from the local Maria Perini Ballet Studio in 1924. He continued his studies at the Leningrad State Choreographic Institute (today the Vaganova Academy) between 1926 and 1929. He debuted at the Kirov State Academic Theatre of Opera and Ballet (today the Marrinsky Ballet) in Leningrad in 1929, and took part in the first Soviet ballets tours in Italy and the United States in the 1930s. He quickly established himself as a skillful artist and became a leading soloist with the Kirov.

== Leningrad ==
Chabukiani's rise to prominence in the 1930s enabled him to combine classic ballet with Georgian folk dance traditions to create a form of dance that is uniquely Georgian. Heroism and romanticism were characteristics of his style both as dancer and choreographer. He also regularly challenged the refined delicacy of ballet and gave male dancers an active leading role in the work.

On 16 May 1930, Chabukiani performed as Siegfried in Swan Lake. Galina Ulanova, famous for her performances in the role of Odette, wrote: "Such a partner as Konstantin Sergeyev provides my dancing interpretation with more lyricism, while, on the other hand - Chabukiani adds more temperament". He also performed in Don Quixote on 16 November 1930. He became renowned not only in Leningrad, but also around the whole USSR. When tenor Leonid Sobinov first saw him, he exclaimed: "This is a miracle of nature". The Soviet press wrote:

Chabukiani was born with dance in his blood and probably returned some of his back to the dance... His courageous appearance, explosive temperament, power and frankly virtuosic dancing, symbolizing the heroic origin, was expected by the Soviet ballet. The dancer did not fade into the background of partners [but] as if caus[ing an] all-comers competition, reveled in freedom, soar[ed] in flights-jumps, [rose] in mad, seeming infinite rotations...

In her book Soviet Ballet (1945), English writer and journalist Iris Morley wrote:

...[In] trying to describe this unusual and magnificent dancer, [I] experienced the same difficulty, as when trying to describe a tornado. He takes possession of the whole scene, betrayed wonderful fury, sometimes dying down so that stunned the audience can see the body, as if was hewn by Rodin, you see the eagle which fell on the rocks of the Caucasus… He is both a great classical dancer, the heir to all the traditions of Leningrad, and the embodiment of the rich folklore of his native Georgia…

Before his American tour, Chabukiani and his partner Tatyana Vecheslova gave concerts in Latvia and Estonia, where they performed pas de deux from Flames of Paris, Le Corsaire and Don Quixote.

In 1938, the Kirov performed Chabukiani's own ballet The Heart of the Mountains, to music by Andria Balanchivadze (brother of George Balanchine). In 1939, Chabukiani created the ballet Laurencia, based on the play Fuente Ovejuna by Lope de Vega and music by Alexander Krein. In this performance, Chabukiani attempted to combine the principles of choreodramy and virtuosic classical dance.

When a reporter asked Maya Plisetskaya what marked the beginning of the Soviet ballet, she answered: "the ballets of Chabukiani…"

In 1941, Chabukiani and Vladimir Ponomaryov produced a revival of La Bayadère at the Kirov, which is still retained in the company's repertory. It has served as the basis for many productions in Russia and abroad, including Rudolf Nureyev's and Natalia Makarova's.

== Eviction from the Kirov ==
At the start of World War II, the Soviet government demanded works supporting the policy of the USSR. One such ballet was Taras Bulba, adapted by Rostislav Zakharov from the short story Taras Bulba by Nikolai Gogol. The premiere took place on 12 December 1940 at the Kirov. Chabukiani performed as Andriy, the negative character. He played the role so well that his negative character began to be perceived as positive. Communist leaders accused him of playing incorrectly; the affair became political, and Chabukiani was expelled from the company and transferred to Tbilisi.

== Return to Tbilisi ==
In 1941, Chabukiani returned to Georgia and served as the chief dancer and choreographer at the Tbilisi Theatre of Opera and Ballet until 1973, when he took charge of the Tbilisi Choreographic School. He played a major role in developing ballet in Georgia and in the training of a new generation of dancers. Among Chabukiani's students were Vladimir Djouloukhadze, Irina Jandieri, Nino (Nina) Ananiashvili, Irma Nioradze, Nikolay Tsiskaridze and Igor Zelensky, as well as David Makhateli, Elena Glurjidze, Lali Kandelaki, and Zakharia Amonashvili. "My principles remain unchanged", he argued, "Georgian Classic Ballet must be established on the national basis, folklore elements must be organically confluent with the classic ones, but the proportions must be carefully distributed and strictly defined…".

In his documentary The Wizard of Dance: Vakhtang Chabukiani, Kote Makharadze recalls about the Tbilisi premiere of the ballet The Heart of the Mountains: "Georgian folk dance of the warriors "Khorumi" from the third act, enriched by unexpected passages, chords and cascades of ballet steps, had been ending with a fiery dance "Mtiuluri (Mountain Dance)" performing by Chabukiani in a duet with the outstanding folk dancer, founder of National Ballet, Iliko Sukhishvili. And when the two great masters, having different plastics, crossed their arms on the stage of art, used to become the real firework of dance… Just that dance became the first stone of building in excitable Georgian National Ballet…"

Chabukiani also worked on several films and staged ballets throughout the world: Glory of the Kirov (1940), Stars of the Russian Ballet (1953), Masters of the Georgian Ballet (1955), and The Moor of Venice: Othello '1960).

In 1958 in Moscow, his ballet The Moor of Venice: Othello, with music by Aleksandr Machavariani and a stage design by Simon Virsaladze, premiered on the occasion of Georgian Art Decade; the leading roles were performed by himself, Vera Tsignadze, and Zurab Kikaleishvili. He was awarded the Lenin Prize, the second ballet artist after Galina Ulanova in 1957. Maya Plisetskaya wrote: "The Moor personalized by Vakhtang Chabukiani is incomparable. His Othello represents the simplicity, plainness, wisdom and child naivety. This is a glory of people who created this unforgettable masterpiece". The Kirov premiere of Othello was noted by the press as truly "Chaliapin's performance". Howard Thompson, in a New York Times review of a 1960 film version, described it as "Shakespeare with electricity". Chabukiani invited Mikhail Dudko to perform the role of Brabantio in the film version, although his career had been ended by the Soviet regime.

In 1961, Chabukiani choreographed Maurice Ravel's Boléro; in 1967, a new ballet Sunrise/განთიადი, to a score by F. Glonti; and in 1980, the one-act ballet Appassionata, to music Ludwig van Beethoven's Piano Sonata No. 23.

== Awards ==
Throughout his career, Chabukiani received numerous awards and titles, including Honored Artist of the RSFSR (1939), People's Artist of the Georgian SSR (1943), People's Artist of the USSR (1950), two Stalin Prizes first degree (1941, 1948, Stalin Prize second degree (1951) and Lenin Prize (1958).

== Personal life ==
Chabukiani is thought to have been homosexual and had at one point been persecuted by Soviet Georgian political leadership, in part, due to his sexuality. Some have used Chabukuani as an example of Georgian tolerance for homosexuals, in contrast with the challenges facing LGBT rights in the country.

== Film The Moor of Venice - Othello 1960 ==
Film-Ballet from William Shakespeare's tragedy Othello

Director and Choreographer : Vakhtang Chabukiani
Stage designer : Simon (Soliko) Virsaladze
Composer: Aleksandr Machavariani
Conductor: Odysseas Dimitriadis
Orchestra: Tbilisi Zahkaria Paliashvili Opera State Orchestra
Film Producer : Tbilisi Cinema Studio

| Role | Performer |
|---|---|
| Othello | Vakhtang Chabukiani |
| Desdemona | Vera Tsignadze |
| Iago | Zurab Kikaleishvili |
| Emilia | Leila Mitiashvili |
| Bianka | Eter Chabukiani |
| Kasio | Bekar Monavardishvili |
| Brabantio | Mikhail Dudko |

== Variations ==
- La Bayadère

Today, La Bayadère is performed primarily in versions derived either from Chabukiani and Vladimir Ponomaryov's 1941 revival for the Kirov Ballet, or from Natalia Makarova's 1980 version for the American Ballet Theatre, which is itself derived from Chabukiani and Ponomarev's version.
In 1941, Chabukiani re-choreographed Solor's variation in the grand pas d'action of act III for himself. It is still danced today by all performers of the role of Solor.

- Le Corsaire

Today, the variation from the pas d'esclave is performed with choreography created by Chabukiani in 1931.
Chabukiani also decisively refashioned the male dancing of Le Corsaire pas de deux during his performances as the Slave (or Rhab, as the character was known in Russia) in the 1936 Kirov revival by Agrippina Vaganova, by giving the male role more athletic and virtuoso choreographic elements. His interpretation of the male role became the standard to the present day, with later alterations from Pyotr Gusev's 1955 revival for the Maly Theatre.

- Swan Lake

Prince Siegfried's famous variation in the Black Swan pas de deux has been historically credited to Chabukiani, who has been said to be the first to dance it in the 1930s, although he had most likely learned it from Alexander Alexeyevich Gorsky. Today, the Mariinsky Ballet's score for Swan Lake has this variation titled with a rubric that says "Variation of Chabukiani". This variation is used by nearly every company, though there are often differences in orchestration from production to production: for example, the Mariinsky version is orchestrated for solo oboe at the start, whereas in the West it is usually the full violin section that plays throughout.

- La Esmeralda

Agrippina Vaganova, in her 1935 Kirov revival, added a "new" pas d'action for Galina Ulanova and Chabukiani, which she arranged to music for the Pas de Diane in Marius Petipa's 1868 ballet Tsar Kandavl (or Le Roi Candaule), composed by Cesare Pugni and Riccardo Drigo. It is known today as the Diane and Actéon pas de deux.
When Chabukiani performed the work in the 1930s, he also added music from Pugni's original score as a variation for himself in another piece, the La Esmeralda pas de deux. Today, the variation is retained in the ballet and remains popular with danseurs.

== Excerpts from articles ==
New York Times Jan. 13, 1934 - "Took New York by Storm in MOST SENSATIONAL SUCCESS of the SEASON!"

- John Martin

Cultural relations with the U.S.S.R were resumed last night when Vecheslova and Chabukiani from Marinsky Theatre, Leningrad, made their American debut at the most hilarious events which has graced the dance platform in many a season. Chabukiani is a swarthy young giant with dashing manner and a facility for doing unbelievable technical tricks. His leaps, his turns, his lifts are phenomenal. Vecheslova seconds him along the same lines.
The political influence of Soviet dancing is nothing to be alarmed about. Its freedom and disarming spirit are extremely potent. The audience simply adored it and bravoed throughout the evening with sincerity. The performance is fittingly to be described as a riot!

- Julian Seaman

Starting success! By sheer youth and electric vitality, Vecheslova and Chabukiani won the immediate and vociferous approval of a crowded house. Both have been trained in traditions of the Imperial Ballet; both have had wide experience in their own and other lands; both are artists of very first rank. One rarely sees such perfect co-ordination and control of the human body. There was something so graceful and intense in their movements that I cheered with the rest. I know of no better way to restore one's faith in the ballet of old than to see this youth maiden from Soviet realm.

- Henriette Weber

A large audience gathered at Carnegie Hall and gave them rousing applause. They deserved it. Both are skilled dancers, thoroughly trained technicians. Chabukiani makes a stunning appearance and has magnetism that projects itself out to the audience. Vecheslova is likewise exceedingly well trained and expert.

- Henry Beckett

Vecheslova and Chabukiani can leap higher and whirl faster than perhaps any dancers alive, and last night their agility and gusto vastly delighted the public at Carnegie Hall, Judging by the enthusiasm, this event was undoubtedly a box-office success. It is zestful and brilliant.
