= List of the main ballet masters of the Saint Petersburg State Ballet =

The troops of the ballet of Saint Petersburg were created to the imperial theatres; after the revolution in 1917, it passed to the property of the State of USSR, with all structure of the Imperial theatres.

In the course of their existence, the troops worked in several theatrical buildings:

The Home of Opera at the edge of Neva (ru: Невская першпектива; on 1742–1749)

The Home of Opera near the Summer Garden (ru: Летний сад; on 1750–1763)

The Theatre Free Russian or the theatre of Karl Knipper (founded in 1777; in 1783 is bought to imperial treasure; then called the Wooden City Theatre (ru: Городской Деревянный театр) — on 1797)

The Hermitage Theatre (from 1785), the Imperial theater in the Gatchina Palace (to Paul I of Russia, the end of the 18th century)

The Bolshoi Kamenny Theatre (on 1784 - 1886)

The Alexandrinsky Theatre (from 1832; then the theatre became dramatic)

Mikhaylovsky Theatre (from 1833), the Theatre-circus (1849–1859, destroyed in the fire)

The Mariinsky Theatre (from 1860)

In 1870, the imperial ballet has officially moved to the Mariinsky Theatre, but the dancers participated in operas and dramas of other theatres of the imperial troupe.

After the revolution of 1917, each of the imperial theatres gained autonomy, and the ballet has started to be at the Mariinsky theatre. Dancers from the Mariinsky theatre's most have not been involved in productions of other theatres.

The Ballet masters of these troupes were:

- 1733—1747 : Jean-Baptiste Landé
- 1742—1759 : Antonio Rinaldi
- 1758—1764 : Franz Hilverding
- 1766—1772 : Gasparo Angiolini
- 1779—1783 : Giuseppe Canziani
- 1784—1792 : Giuseppe Canziani
- 1792—1799 : Charles Le Picq
- 1799—1801 : Pierre Peicam Chevalier (ru: Шевалье Пекен, Пьер)
- 1801—1811 : Charles Didelot
- 1803—1819 : Ivan Valberkh, in distribution with Didelot, then the only
- 1816—1831 : Charles Didelot, in distribution with Valberkh, then the only
- 1832 or 1832—1836 : Alexis Blache
- 1832—1848 or 1837—1848 : Antoine Titus
- 1848—1859 : Jules Perrot
- 1859—1869 : Arthur Saint-Léon
- 1869—1904 : Marius Petipa
- 1904—1909 : Michel Fokine
- 1909—1922 : Nikolai Legat
- 1922—1931 : Fyodor Lopukhov
- 1931—1937 : Agrippina Vaganova
- 1938—1944 : Leonid Lavrovsky
- 1944—1946 : Fedor Lopoukhov
- 1946—1951 : Pyotr Gusev
- 1951—1955 : Konstantin Sergeyev
- 1955—1956 : Fedor Lopoukhov
- 1956—1959 : Boris Fenster
- 1960—1966 : Konstantin Sergeyev
- 1967—1972 : Oleg Vinogradov
- 1972—1977 : ?
- 1977—1995 : Oleg Vinogradov
- 1995—2008 : Makharbek Vaziev
- 2008 — Yuri Fateyev (ru:Фатеев, Юрий Валерьевич)

== See also ==
- Ballet music
- History of ballet
- List of ballets by title
- List of Russian ballet dancers
