= Ulyana Lopatkina =

Russian prima ballerina (born 1973)

Ulyana Lopatkina Ульяна Лопаткина
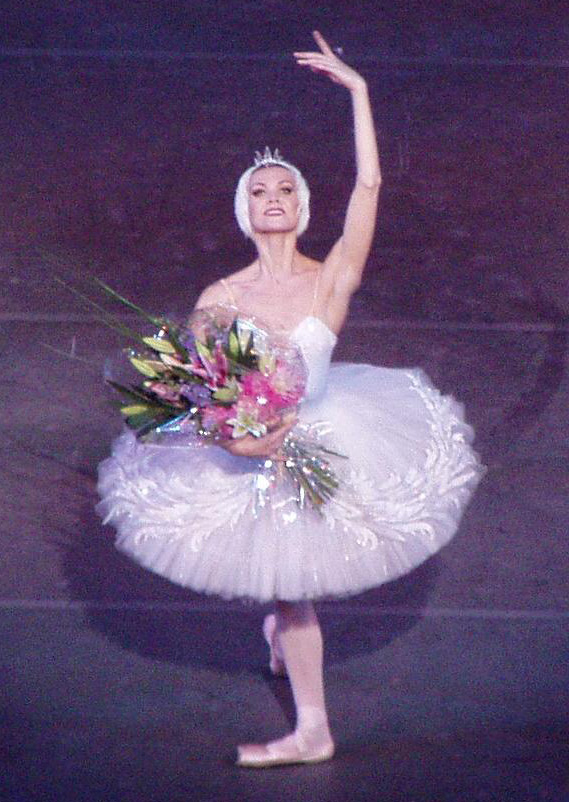
- Lopatkina at the curtain call of Swan Lake at the Royal Opera House, 2009
- Born: Ulyana Vyacheslavovna Lopatkina; 23 October 1973 (age 52); Kerch, Crimea, Ukrainian SSR, Soviet Union
- Education: Vaganova Ballet Academy
- Occupation: Ballet dancer
- Known for: Swan Lake, Giselle
- Spouse: Vladimir Kornev (div. 2010)
- Children: 1
- Awards: Selected: Honored Artist of Russia (2000), People's Artist of Russia (2006)

Ulyana Vyacheslavovna Lopatkina (Russian: Ульяна Вячеславовна Лопаткина; born 23 October 1973) is a Russian prima ballerina who performed with the Mariinsky Theatre from 1991–2017. She studied at the Vaganova Academy with Natalia Dudinskaya. Upon graduation Lopatkina joined the Kirov/Mariinsky Theatre Ballet in 1991, and was promoted to principal dancer in 1995. Lopatkina did not dance during the 2016–2017 season due to injury, and her retirement from the Mariinsky was announced on the company's website on 16 June 2017.

== Performances and repertoire ==
Lopatkina is known for her classic and dramatic roles. She fits the ideal of the Russian (Kirov) school with long limbs, great strength and a classical purity of line, as well as noted musicality.

Her repertoire includes:

- Giselle (Giselle, Myrtha),
- Le Corsaire (Medora)
- La Bayadère (Nikia)
- Grand pas from Paquita
- The Sleeping Beauty (Lilac Fairy)
- Swan Lake (Odette-Odile)
- Raymonda (Raymonda, Clemans)
- The Swan
- Scheherazade (Zobeide)
- The Fountain of Bakhchisarai (Zarema)
- The Legend of Love (Mekhmeneh Bahnu)
- Leningrad Symphony (The Girl)
- Pas de Quatre (Маria Taglioni)
- Serenade
- Tchaikovsky's Piano Concerto No. 2 (Ballet Imperial)
- Symphony in C (2nd Movement)
- La Valse
- Jewels (Diamonds)
- In the Night
- The Nutcracker (highlights: Teacher and Pupil)
- Le jeune homme et la mort
- Goya-Divertissement
- Le baiser de la fée (Fairy), Le Poeme de l´Extase
- In the Middle

== Personal life ==
Lopatkina was married to architect and writer Vladimir Kornev until their divorce in 2010. They have a daughter, Masha, born 2002.

Lopatkina revealed details about her daily life in an interview to The Sunday Times in 2005. She wakes up between 9am to 10am. At the Kirov, she first attends a class with other dancers and followed this with a personal rehearsal with Ninel Kurgapkina, until the latter's death. After a break, Lopatkina has more rehearsals or helps teaching younger dancers.

Lopatkina is a tall ballerina: she is 5 feet 9 inches (1.75 m) and wears shoes size 10.5 US (8 UK). Lopatkina uses two pairs of shoes in each performance which are specially made for her.

== Awards ==
- International Vaganova-prix Competition (St. Petersburg, 1991).
- Golden Sofit (1995)
- The Golden Mask (1997)
- Prix Benois de la Danse (1997)
- The Baltika Prize (1997)
- The Evening Standard (1998)
- State Prize of Russia (1999)
- Honoured Artist of Russia (2000)
- The Baltika Prize (2001)
- People's Artist of Russia (2006).

== Filmography and photo gallery ==
- Lopatkina's Filmography. MSN Movies (retrieved 30 December 2007)
- Lopatkina – Photo Gallery at www.ballerinagallery.com (retrieved 30 December 2007)

== See also ==
- List of Russian ballet dancers
