= Variation (ballet) =

Solo ballet dance

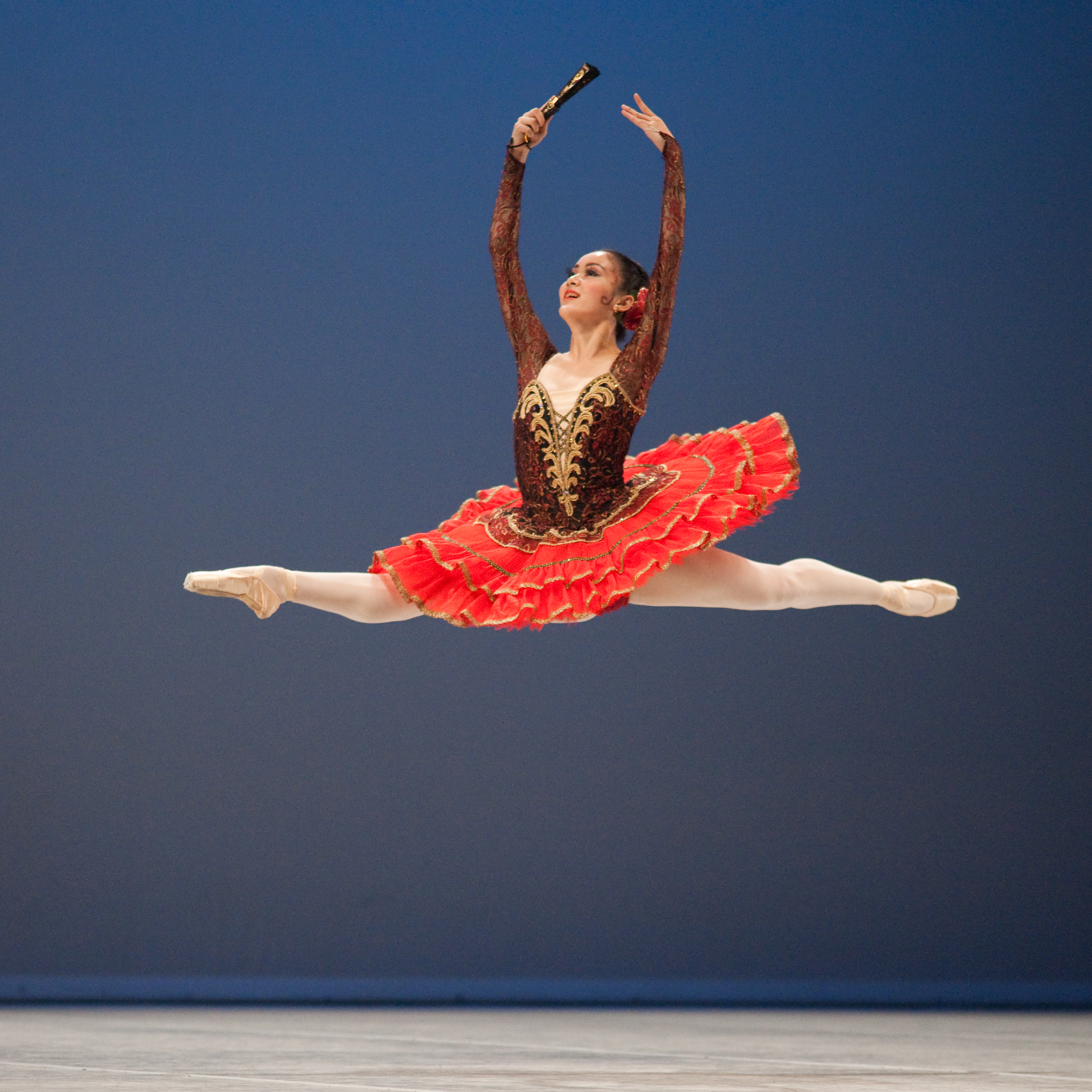
Hinano Eto as Kitri in Don Quixote, Prix de Lausanne, 2010

In ballet, a variation (sometimes referred to as a pas seul, meaning to dance alone) is a solo dance. In a classical grand pas de deux, the ballerina and danseur each perform a variation.

== Examples ==
- La Bayadère – Gamzatti, Nikiya
- Coppélia – Swanhilda
- Le Corsaire – Medora
- Diana and Acteon – Diana
- Don Quixote – Basilio, Kitri, Cupid
- The Nutcracker – Sugar Plum Fairy
- Sleeping Beauty – Bluebird
- Swan Lake – Odile (the Black Swan)
