= Varvara P. Mey =

Varvara Pavlovna Mey (Russian: Варвара Павловна Мей, 18 January 1912 (Note: Russia used the Julian calendar in 1912. Mey was born 5 January (Julian), 18 January (Gregorian).) in Saint Petersburg – 27 October 1995) was a prima ballerina, ballet instructor and author.

== Career ==
Mey was one of the students of the Russian ballet dance method founder, Agrippina Vaganova. She graduated from the Petrograd Choreographic School Vaganova class. She sang in what is now the Mariinsky Theatre from 1929, and then started her dancing career, graduating from the Leningrad Ballet School in 1940 and the Leningrad Conservatory, led by Vaganova, in 1951. She danced at the Kirov Ballet in Leningrad for many years. She was an "outstanding teacher of classical dance" who taught many of Russian ballet's biggest stars at the Vaganova Academy of Russian Ballet.

== Publications ==
Mey co-wrote the book Alphabet of Classical Dance: 12th to 19th Century with Nadezhda Bazarova. Her book gives insight on ballet and is used by millions to learn ballet technique from the beginning. It was originally printed in Russian, but was later translated and is now available in many different languages.

== Awards ==
Mey was named Honoured Artist of the Bashkir Autonomous Soviet Socialist Republic in 1969.

== Legacy ==
In 1987, the French singer and actress Vanessa Paradis recorded a song called "Varvara Pavlovna" on side two of her successful 7-inch single "Joe le taxi".

== See also ==
- List of Russian ballet dancers
