= La Esmeralda (ballet) =

Ballet by Cesare Pugni and Jules Perrot

La Esmeralda is a ballet in three acts and five scenes, inspired by the 1831 novel Notre-Dame de Paris by Victor Hugo, originally choreographed by Jules Perrot to music by Cesare Pugni, with sets by William Grieve and costumes by Mme. Copère.

It was first presented by the Ballet of her Majesty's Theatre, London on 9 March 1844, with Carlotta Grisi as Esmeralda, Jules Perrot as Gringoire, Arthur Saint-Leon as Phoebus, Adelaide Frassi as Fleur de Lys, and Antoine Louis Coulon as Quasimodo.

Today the complete ballet is usually performed only in Russia, Eastern Europe, and by two ballet companies in the United States. The New Jersey Ballet introduced the full-length version for the first time in the United States in 2004, and the Russian Ballet Orlando performed La Esmeralda for the first time in 2021. Most Western ballet companies perform only two Esmeralda-related pieces—La Esmeralda pas de deux and La Esmeralda pas de six—and the Diane and Actéon Pas de Deux, which is actually not excerpted from the ballet, but often mistakenly credited as having been added by Marius Petipa to his 1886 revival of La Esmeralda. Variations from the ballet are still commonly performed by students at ballet competitions.

== Plot ==
Plot outline based on the full synopsis translated by Professor Roland John Wiley:

The beautiful Romani girl Esmeralda marries the poet Pierre Gringoire, to save him from death in the hands of the Romani king. The groom is smitten with his new bride, but she makes it clear that the marriage is strictly one of convenience. Gringoire is not the only one infatuated with Esmeralda, the archdeacon of Notre Dame cathedral, Claude Frollo, is dangerously obsessed with the girl and orders his deformed henchman, Quasimodo, to abduct her. When Quasimodo attacks Esmeralda in the street, she is rescued by the King's Archers, led by their handsome captain Phoebus de Chateaupers, who capture Quasimodo. They plan to torture him, but Esmeralda asks for his release. The hunchback is deeply touched by her kindness. Phoebus is enchanted by the girl and gives her a scarf that was given to him by his fiancée, Fleur de Lys.

The next day, Fleur de Lys and her mother hold a grand celebration for her engagement to Phoebus, who is distracted by thoughts of Esmeralda. She arrives to entertain the guests, but is left heartbroken when she sees that Fleur de Lys' fiancé is none other than her beloved Phoebus. Fleur de Lys notices that Esmeralda is wearing the scarf that she gave to Phoebus and realising that he has fallen in love with another, angrily calls off the engagement. Phoebus leaves with Esmeralda. Alone in a tavern, the two declare their love for each other, unaware that the archdeacon Frollo is also there, eavesdropping on them. Taking a dagger that he stole from Esmeralda's room, Frollo sneaks up behind the lovers and stabs Phoebus, who falls unconscious to the ground. Frollo calls for the authorities, shows them the body of Phoebus and the dagger that was used to stab him, which is identified as Esmeralda's. The poor girl is taken away and sentenced to death.

At dawn the following morning, the Festival of Fools is under way and Esmeralda is due to be hanged for the murder of Phoebus. Her friends and Gringoire are all present and bid her farewell, while Frollo watches in triumph. Just as Esmeralda is led to the gallows, Phoebus arrives alive and well, having survived and recovered from the stabbing. He reveals the true culprit to be Frollo and announces that Esmeralda is innocent of any crime. Frollo takes a dagger and attempts to do away with them, but Quasimodo wrests the dagger from his master and stabs him to death. Esmeralda and Phoebus are happily reunited.

== Revivals ==
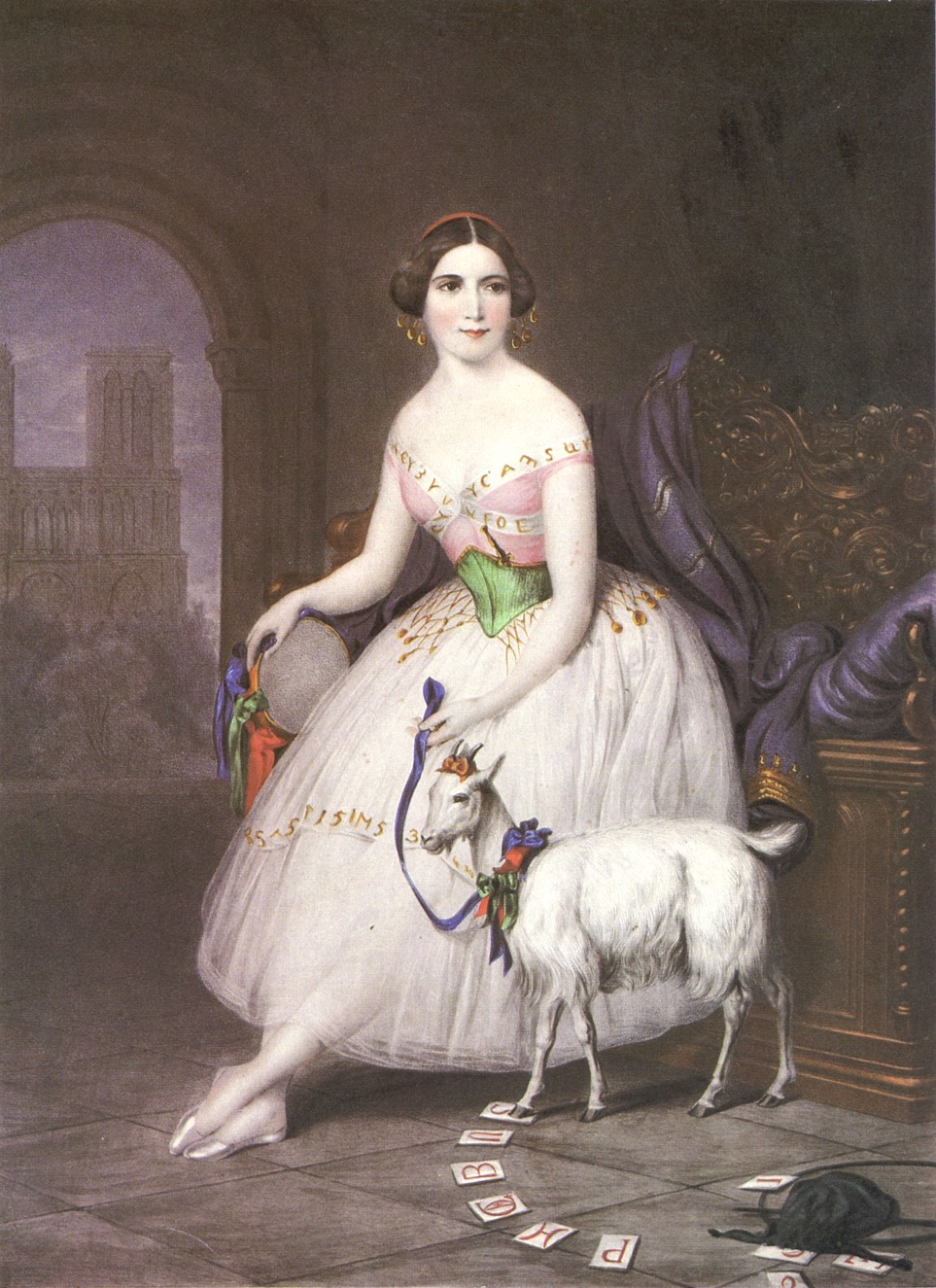
Fanny Cerrito in the title role of the Pugni/Perrot La Esmeralda, London, circa 1844.

- Jules Perrot for the Imperial Ballet. Imperial Bolshoi Kamenny Theatre, St. Petersburg, 2 January 1849. Revived especially for the ballerina Fanny Elssler. Cesare Pugni revised his original score for the production.
- Marius Petipa for the Imperial Ballet in four acts and five scenes. Imperial Mariinsky Theatre, St. Petersburg, 17 December 1886. Revived especially for the ballerina Virginia Zucchi. Musical revision and additional pas by Riccardo Drigo (including a Pas de six for Virginia Zucchi). Petipa added additional numbers in 1866 (a Pas de deux for the ballerina Claudina Cucchi that became known as the Pas Cucchi to the music of Pugni), 1871 (a Pas de dix for the Ballerina Eugenia Sokolova to the music of Yuli Gerber), and 1872 (a Pas de cinq for the ballerina Adèle Grantzow to music by an unknown composer).
- Marius Petipa for the Imperial Ballet in four acts and five scenes. Imperial Mariinsky Theatre, St. Petersburg, 21 November 1899. Revived especially for the Prima Ballerina Assoluta Mathilde Kschessinskaya.
- Agrippina Vaganova for the Kirov Ballet in three acts. Kirov Theatre of Opera and Ballet, Leningrad, 3 April 1935. Revived especially for the ballerina Tatiana Vecheslova. Vaganova added a "new" Pas d'action as a showpiece for the dancers Galina Ulanova and Vakhtang Chabukiani, which she arranged from the Pas de Diane from Petipa's 1868 ballet Tsar Kandavl or Le Roi Candaule to music by Pugni and Drigo, which is known today as the Diane and Actéon pas de deux.
- Pyotr Gusev for the Kirov Ballet in three acts. Kirov Theatre of Opera and Ballet, Leningrad, 1949.
- For the Bolshoi Ballet in 2009, Yuri Burlaka and Vasily Medvedev staged a revival based on Petipa's final 1899 revival of La Esmeralda. The complete list of numbers is provided by Naughton.

== See also ==
- Notre Dame de Paris
