= Elena Glurjidze =

Georgian ballet dancer

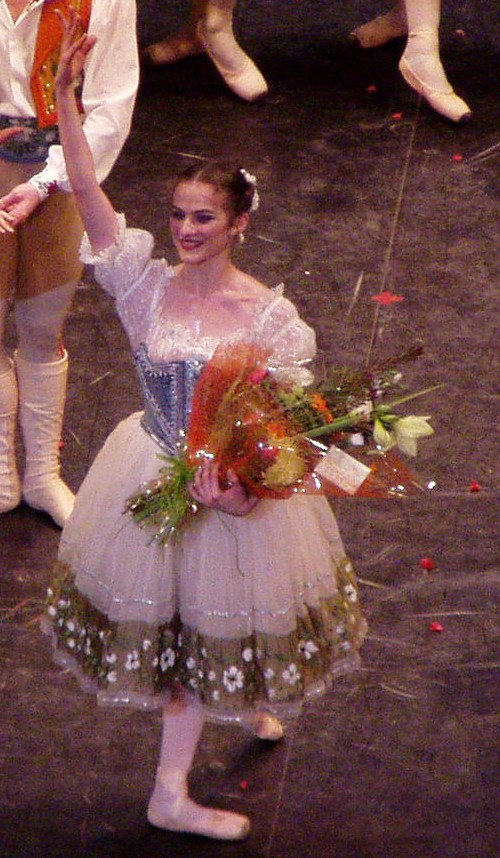
- Born: Tbilisi, Georgian SSR
- Education: Arts school, Tbilisi; Choreographic ballet school, Tbilisi; Vaganova Academy, Saint Petersburg
- Occupations: Ballet dancer, ballet teacher
- Years active: 2002- actual
- Spouse: Kakhaber Abashidze
- Children: Alexander Glurjidze
- Career
- Former groups: English National Ballet
- Website: elenaglurjidze.com

Elena Glurjidze is a senior principal ballerina at the English National Ballet.

== Biography ==
Elena was born into the family of Georgian scientist L. Glurjidze. From an early age she showed a passion for the arts and ballet. She started training at the School of Choreography in Tbilisi, Georgia, and later trained in St. Petersburg at the Vaganova Ballet Academy. She joined English National Ballet in 2002, and was voted "Best Female Dancer" in 2007.
