= Laurencia (ballet) =

Ballet

Laurencia is a ballet created by Vakhtang Chabukiani to music by Alexander Krein, based on Lope de Vega's Fuenteovejuna. Created at a time when "choreodrama" was considered in the Soviet Union the only acceptable form of contemporary ballet, it harks back to a genuine drama, wherein movement was a vehicle for meaning, and dance could serve as divertissement as well as dramatic purpose. At the same time, the story of a peasant revolution was obviously the ideal subject for a Soviet ballet. Vakhtang Chabukiani was one of the first to create a new choreographic language by means of his own particular blend of folk dance and classical dance. He asserted once and for all the importance of male dance, furthering in particular the notion of "heroic" male dance.

== Performance history ==
Laurencia was premiered on 22 March 1939 at the Kirov Opera and Ballet Theatre. Soliko Virsaladze designed the scenery and costumes. The leading parts were performed by Natalia Dudinskaya (Laurencia), Vakhtang Chabukiani (Frondoso), Elene Chikvaidze (Jacinta), Mikhail Dudko (Commander) and Tatiana Vecheslova (Pascuala). On 14 November 1948, it was staged at the Tbilisi Z. Paliashvili Opera and Ballet State Theatre. Georgian prima ballerina Vera Tsignadze, famous for her distinguished and unique technical style, performed the title role. In 1956 the ballet was staged at the Bolshoi Theatre. Here Vakhtang Chabukiani partnered Maya Plisetskaya.

Laurencia had great success everywhere it was performed – in the former USSR and other countries. In 1979 Vakhtang Chabukiani again revived the ballet for the Tbilisi State Opera and Ballet theatre. I. Askurava designed the scenery and costumes. Irina Jandieri (Premiere), Marina Alexidze, Natalia Papinashvili, Vladimir Djouloukhadze (Premiere), Rusudan Abashidze, Svetlana Gochiashvili, Valeri Abuladze, Zakharia Amonashvili, Nukri Magalashvili, Nugzar Makhateli, and Sergei Tereschenko performed the leading roles.

== Synopsis ==
=== Act I ===
Scene 1

In Fuente Ovejuna, a village in Spain, a holiday crowd has gathered on the main square. Locals dance, while waiting for the return of their Commander from the battle. Youngsters are teasing Laurencia and Frondoso, who is in love with her. Laurencia teases Frondoso herself. Mengo, the violin player, enters and Laurencia’s friend, Pascuala, asks him to play the violin. Young people dance again. Military music is heard from afar. The Commander enters and the villagers salute him obediently, but he does not respond to their greetings. The charming Laurencia has caught his attention. The Commander courts the girl, but she responds with indifference. He loses his temper and, furious, leaves the village with his soldiers.

Scene 2

Bank of the river. Frondoso reveals his feelings to Laurencia, but the girl does not give him a clear answer. The sound of a trumpet can be heard. This is the hunting party of the Commander. He enters and tries to abduct Laurencia, but Frondoso defends the girl bravely from her loathed admirer. The Commander swears to seek revenge on them both. Village girls, more interested in chatting and dance than their work, take laundry to the river. Here comes the merry violin player Mengo, too. The girls meet him with joy. After their work is done, the girls return to the village, but Jacinta is kept behind with her laundry. Suddenly the Commander’s soldiers appear and attack her. Mengo defends the girl from the soldiers fearlessly. When the Commander enters, he orders his men to arrest Mengo and punish him. Jacinta is given into the hands of the soldiers. Laurencia is certain of Frondoso’s bravery, love and devotion now, and gives him her consent to marry.

=== Act II ===
Scene 3

The whole village celebrates the wedding of Laurencia and Frondoso. Merry dances succeed one another to everyone’s delight, but the festivities halt abruptly when the fierce Commander enters the square. He is here to exercise his power, ordering the soldiers to put Frondoso in prison and to take Laurencia to his castle. The fury of the villagers is overwhelming.

Scene 4

The men of the village gather in a forest. They know that it is necessary to fight against the tyranny of the Commander, but are too afraid of him. They stand, lost in fear and despair, and only curse the tyrant. A tormented Laurencia enters. Her heart is burning with feelings of rightful vengeance. She shames the village men for their fear and calls for rebellion. Her passionate voice wins over the locals. Even the village women are ready to fight together with her. People armed with knives, sickles and spears, rush to the castle of the Commander.

Scene 5

Villagers break into the Commander’s castle. They free Frondoso and kill the tyrant. The people celebrate their victory.
