= Le Corsaire =

1856 ballet

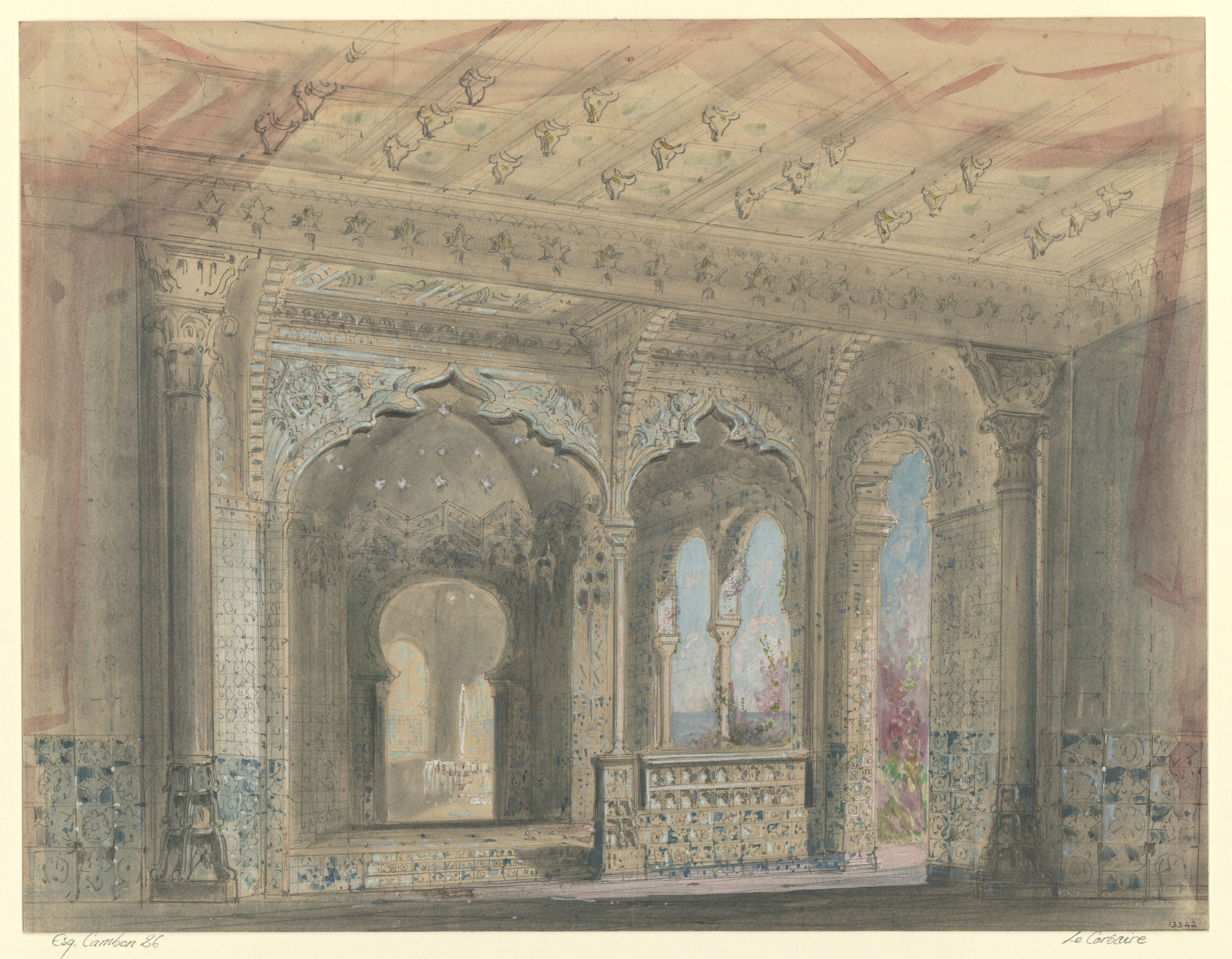
Set design by Charles-Antoine Cambon for act 3, scene 1, in the première production

Le Corsaire is a ballet typically presented in three acts, with a libretto originally created by Jules-Henri Vernoy de Saint-Georges loosely based on the poem The Corsair by Lord Byron. Originally choreographed by Joseph Mazilier to the music of Adolphe Adam and other composers, it was first presented by the ballet of the Théâtre Impérial de l’Opéra in Paris on 23 January 1856. All modern productions of Le Corsaire are derived from the revivals staged by the Ballet Master Marius Petipa for the Imperial Ballet of St. Petersburg throughout the mid to late 19th century.

The ballet has many celebrated passages which are often excerpted from the full-length work and performed independently: the scene Le Jardin animé, the Pas d’esclave, the Pas de trois des odalisques, and the so-called Le Corsaire pas de deux (music mostly by Riccardo Drigo), which is among classical ballet's most famous and performed excerpts.

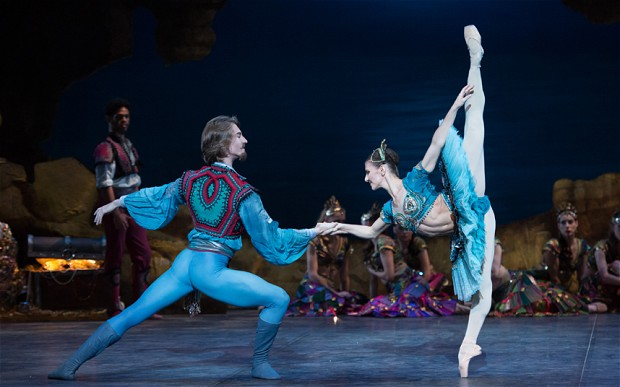
Vadim Muntagirov and Alina Cojocaru in the roles of Conrad and Medora in Le Corsaire produced by the English National Ballet in 2013

== Synopsis ==
=== Act 1 ===
Scene 1 – A Bazaar in a Seaport Square
Slave girls are among the goods for sale. Corsairs (pirates) arrive with their leader, Conrad. Watching the scene from a balcony is a young woman, Medora, the ward of the bazaar owner, Lankendem. She fashions a coded message into a bouquet of flowers, which she throws to Conrad. Later, when Medora and Lankendem go to the square, she and Conrad exchange loving glances.

At this point, Seyd Pasha, a rich buyer of slave girls, arrives in the square. Seeing Medora, he is smitten and asks to buy her. Lankendem initially refuses, but as Seyd Pasha raises his price Lankendem eventually relents. Seyd Pasha orders that Medora be delivered to his palace and leaves. Conrad promises Medora that he and his corsairs will rescue her. The corsairs begin to dance with the slave girls. At a signal from Conrad the corsairs all run off with the girls. For good measure, they also kidnap Lankendem.

Scene 2 – The Corsair's Den
Medora asks Conrad to release the women slaves. To this he agrees. However, one of his men – Birbanto – objects and begins a fight. Conrad subdues him. Meanwhile, Lankendem tries to escape. The corsairs who are opposed to Conrad's release of the women convince Lankendem to stay long enough to give Conrad a flower sprayed with a sleeping potion.

Later, at dinner, Medora dances for Conrad. Lankendem gives her the flower with the sleeping potion, asking that she give it to Conrad. She does this, and when he smells the flower he falls asleep. Corsairs surround Medora, threatening her. Defensively, she stabs Birbanto in the arm and faints into the arms of the corsairs, who take her away. Conrad awakens and sets out to recapture Medora.

=== Act 2 ===
Scene 3 – Harem at the Palace of Seyd Pasha
The Sultana Zulina demands that the Odalisques (female concubines of the harem) respect her. For this, she is mocked by harem slave Gulnare and her friends. Seyd Pasha enters. Gulnare teases him flirtatiously in dance, and he gives her a handkerchief. She makes fun of him by passing the handkerchief around the group of women. Seyd Pasha is furious. His Keeper of the Harem attempts to distract and calm him with dancing performances by the girls. Lankendem arrives, leading Medora in delivery of her sale to Seyd Pasha. She begs Seyd Pasha for her freedom and also complains of mistreatment by Lankendem. Gulnare comforts her. Seyd Pasha offers Medora jewels, which she refuses. The Corsairs enter, disguised as robed members of a religious order. They act embarrassed at the sight of the concubines of the harem. Seyd Pasha orders the women of the harem to dance for the entertainment of his guests.

Conrad, in his disguise, recognizes Medora. The corsairs throw off their disguises and threaten Seyd Pasha with daggers. The Corsairs begin pillaging the palace. Gulnare rushes in, pursued by Birbanto. Medora recognizes Birbanto as her kidnapper and informs Conrad. She demonstrates the identification by pointing out the wound she inflicted on Birbanto's arm. Medora prevents Conrad from killing Birbanto, who then runs away. Seyd Pasha's guards enter and attack the corsairs, capturing them including Conrad. Seyd Pasha sentences Conrad to death.

=== Act 3 ===
Scene 4 – Seyd Pasha's Private Room at the Palace
Seyd Pasha proposes to Medora, who refuses him. As Conrad is led to his execution, Medora begs Seyd Pasha to pardon him. He agrees on the condition that she freely submit to him. He leaves the room as she considers the offer. Conrad is able to run to her; she informs him of the deal she must make to have him freed. Conrad objects and talks her out of the offer. They resolve to die together. At this point Gulnare, who is in love with Seyd Pasha, approaches the two and proposes a plan to secretly switch places with Medora in the wedding.

Seyd Pasha returns to the room where after assurances from Medora he orders Conrad to be freed and the marriage ceremony to commence. Later, as the wedding procession approaches, the bride enters covered in a veil. Seyd Pasha places a ring on the bride's finger in marriage, and the odalisques dance.

After the wedding, Seyd Pasha is alone with Medora. As she dances for him, she tells him that the pistol on his belt scares her and asks that he give it to her. He complies. She then asks for his dagger, and he hands that over also. She continues to dance to evade him. As he kneels before her and begs for her love, he hands her his handkerchief. Acting as if playfully joking, she ties his hands with the handkerchief.

At this point Conrad enters the room. He and Medora threaten Seyd Pasha, warning him not to raise a cry of alarm. They escape. Gulnare rushes into the room and unties Seyd Pasha. She shows him the ring on her finger and reveals it was she whom he had married.

Scene 5 – Corsair Ship at Sea
At first the sea is calm. Birbanto is in chains. On Medora's pleas, Conrad releases him. As a storm arises, Birbanto tries to sow dissatisfaction among the crew. Conrad throws him overboard. The ship runs aground. The sea calms. Conrad and Medora are seen climbing safely on to land together.

== Origins ==
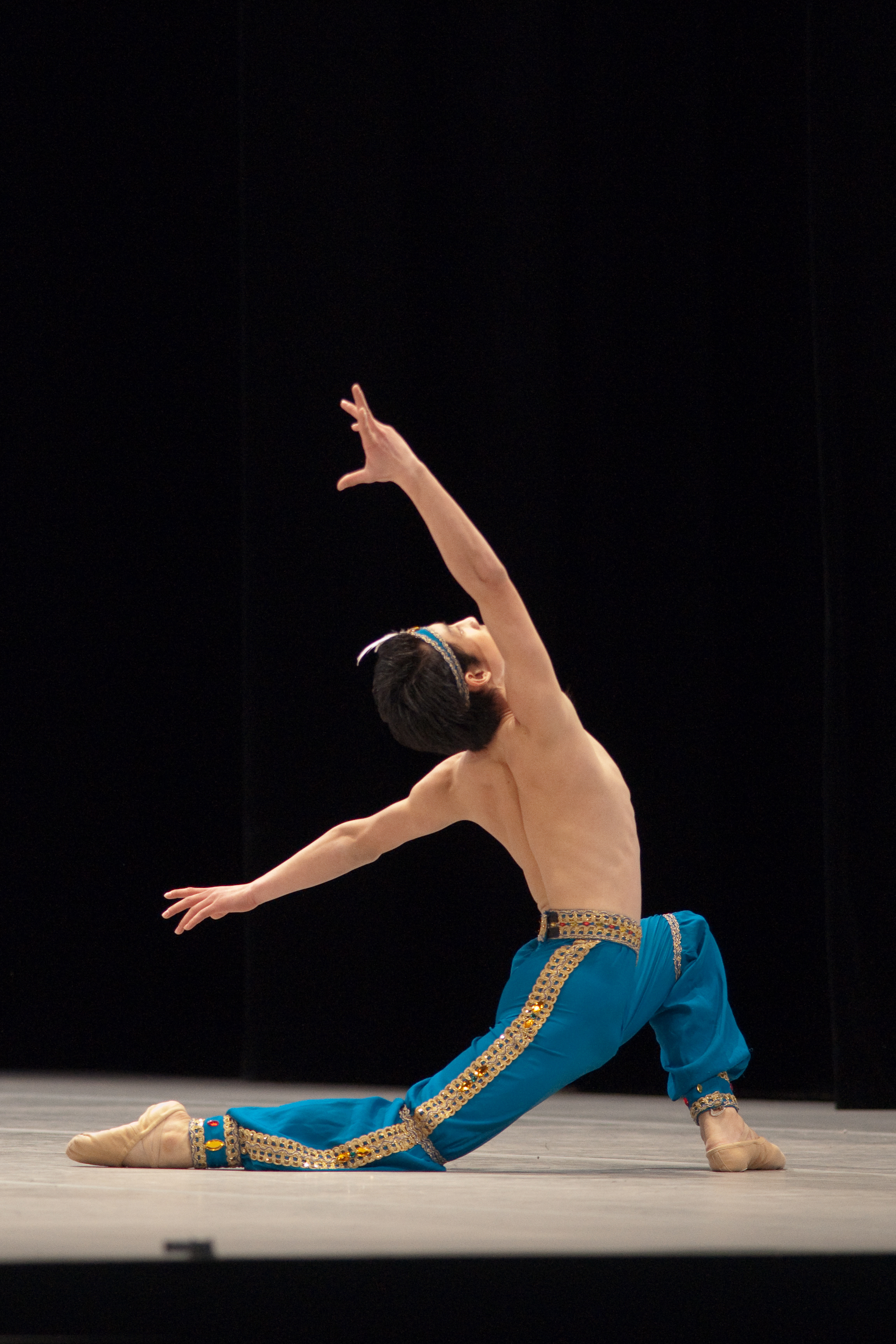
Variation of Le Corsaire at the Prix de Lausanne 2010.

Le Corsaire was created primarily for the talents of the famous Italian ballerina Carolina Rosati, who was then the Opéra's reigning Prima ballerina. The role of Conrad—which contained no dancing in Mazilier's original staging—was created by the Italian Domenico Segarelli. Although he was an accomplished dancer, it was Segarelli's abilities as a mime artist that won him the many roles he created on the stage of the Opéra. It would not be until many years later that the role of Conrad included any dancing.

== Le Corsaire in Russia ==
=== The first production ===
Le Corsaire was first staged in Russia for the Imperial Ballet of St. Petersburg by Jules Perrot, who served as Premier Maître de Ballet of the St. Petersburg Imperial Theatres from 1849 until 1858. Le Corsaire was performed for the first time on 24 January [O.S. 12 January] 1858 at the Imperial Bolshoi Kamenny Theatre, with the Prima ballerina Ekaterina Friedbürg as the heroine Medora, and the young Marius Petipa as the corsair Conrad. For this production Petipa assisted Perrot in rehearsals, and even revised a few of the ballet's key dances.

=== Marius Petipa's revivals ===
Over the course of his long career Petipa presented four revivals of Le Corsaire, each time adding a substantial number of new pas, variations and incidental dances. His first revival was staged especially for his wife, the Prima Ballerina Maria Surovshchikova-Petipa, with the Premier danseur Christian Johansson as Conrad. The production premiered on 5 February [O.S. 24 January] 1863, and included a score supplemented and revised by the composer Cesare Pugni. For this revival, Petipa also extracted a pas de deux, the Pas d'esclave, from Duke Peter Oldenbourg's score to Petipa's ballet La Rose, la violette et le papillon.

Four years later Joseph Mazilier came out of retirement to mount a revival of Le Corsaire in honor of the 1867 Exposition Universelle, given that year in Paris. The celebrated German ballerina Adèle Grantzow performed the role of Medora, while Adolphe Adam's former pupil Léo Delibes composed new music for a Pas des fleurs especially for Grantzow. The revival premiered on 21 October 1867 and was given thirty-eight performances with Grantzow as the heroine Medora. After the ballerina's departure from Paris in 1868, Le Corsaire was removed from the Opéra's repertory, never to be performed by the Parisian ballet again.

In the winter of 1867, Granztow was invited to perform with the Imperial Ballet in St. Petersburg by Emperor Alexander II. For her début, Petipa staged a revival of Le Corsaire, which was given for the first time on 6 February [O.S. 25 January] 1868. For the production Petipa again called upon Cesare Pugni to compose music for new dances.

Petipa's third revival of Le Corsaire was staged especially for the Russian Ballerina Eugeniia Sokolova, given for the first time on 22 November [O.S. 10 November] 1880.

Petipa's final and most important revival of Le Corsaire premiered on 25 January [O.S. 13 January] 1899, at the Imperial Mariinsky Theatre. This production was mounted especially for the benefit performance of Pierina Legnani, Prima ballerina assoluta of the St. Petersburg Imperial Theatres. The Prima ballerina Olga Preobrajenskaya performed the role of Gulnare, and the Imperial Theatre's Premier danseur Pavel Gerdt performed the role of Conrad.

== Moscow productions of Le Corsaire ==
In March 1858 Marius Petipa was dispatched to mount Jules Perrot's version of Le Corsaire for the Ballet of the Moscow Imperial Bolshoi Theatre (today known as the Bolshoi Ballet), who continued performing the ballet with some regularity for many years in various revivals. In 1888 Petipa supervised the creation of a new production of Le Corsaire for the company, which premiered to a resounding success. Petipa was a leading choreographer of the time in Russia. In 1894 the Bolshoi Theatre's newly appointed Ballet Master Ivan Clustine mounted his staging of Le Corsaire, which premiered on 22 March [O.S. 10 March] 1894. Petipa would later allege that Clustine's production apparently plagiarised much of his own choreography, particularly for the scene Le jardin animé.

Ekaterina Geltzer as Medora in Alexander Gorsky's production of Le Corsaire. Moscow, 1912

On 25 January [O.S. 12 January] 1912 Alexander Gorsky, Premier Maître de Ballet of the Moscow Imperial Bolshoi Theatre, presented his revival of Le Corsaire, with Ekaterina Geltzer as Medora and Vasily Tikhomirov as Conrad. For this revival Gorsky supervised a substantially revised edition of Adam's score that included a myriad of new dances. The airs of such composers as Edvard Grieg, Anton Simon, Reinhold Glière, Karl Goldmark, Frédéric Chopin, Pyotr Tchaikovsky and Antonín Dvořák were fashioned into dansante accompaniment for new scenes, pas, variations, and the like. Among the most notable scenes added by Gorsky was a dream sequence set to a Nocturne by Chopin, in which the character Medora dreams of her beloved Conrad. Another interpolation of note was a divertissement for Turkish, Persian and Arabian slave-women that took place during the scene in the bazaar of the first act. Even with the production's large number of interpolated pieces, Gorsky chose to retain many of the additional pas as included in the ballet by Mazilier and Petipa.

Gorsky's revival of Le Corsaire remained in the repertory of the Moscow Bolshoi Theatre until 1927. Although the company regularly performed extracts from Le Corsaire for many years thereafter, the full-length work was not given again until Konstantin Sergeyev staged his version for the company in 1992.

=== The Bolshoi Ballet's revival of 2007 ===
On 21 June 2007 the Bolshoi Ballet presented a lavish revival of Le Corsaire staged by Yuri Burlaka and the company's director Alexei Ratmansky. Burlaka utilized the choreographic notation of the Sergeyev Collection, as well as materials found in the Bibliothèque nationale de France, the Bakhrushin Theater Museum and the St. Petersburg State Museum of Theatre and Music to assist in mounting a historically informed production. This version of Le Corsaire proved to be the most expensive production of a ballet ever mounted, estimated at $1.5 million USD.

== Le Corsaire in Leningrad and the West ==
Petipa's 1899 revival of Le Corsaire, which was given its final production in 1915, remained in the repertory of the Mariinsky Theatre until 1928 (after the 1917 Russian Revolution the ballet company was known as the State Petrograd Ballet, and later the State Academic Ballet, before it was renamed the Kirov Ballet). By 1928 Le Corsaire had been performed 224 times since 1899 at the Mariinsky Theatre.

Agrippina Vaganova, the revered pedagogue of Russian Ballet, supervised the first noted post-revolution revival of Le Corsaire for the Kirov Ballet, first performed on 15 May 1931 (Mikhail Dudko as Conrad). In 1936 another revival of Le Corsaire was given by the Kirov Ballet, with Natalia Dudinskaya as Medora, Mikhail Mikhailov as Conrad, and Vakhtang Chabukiani as the Slave (or Rhab, as the character was known in Russia). This was the first production of the full-length work to include Vaganova's 1931 revision of Le Corsaire pas de deux as staged for Dudinskaya's graduation performance. Over time, Konstantin Sergeyev, artistic director and chief choreographer of the Kirov Ballet from 1951 to 1955 and 1960–1970, added various new pieces. From 1941 the production was only given on rare occasions until it was totally removed from the repertory in 1956.

=== Pyotr Gusev’s revival of 1955 ===
The ballet master Pyotr Gusev staged a new version of Le Corsaire for the Maly Theatre Ballet of Leningrad in 1955. This production used a modified version of the original libretto, written by Gusev and the ballet historian Yuri Slonimsky.

Gusev called upon the conductor Eugene Kornblit to fashion a new score for his production. Although the ballet master retained the traditional interpolations as handed down from Petipa's Imperial-era productions, he discarded nearly all of Adam's original 1856 score in favor of music fashioned from passages lifted from Adam's 1840 ballet L′Écumeur de mer (The Pirate) and his 1852 opera Si j’étais roi. With this new music, leitmotifs were created for the ballet's main characters.

A new character was also included—known as the slave Ali—a role which evolved out of the Slave who took part in Le Corsaire pas de deux in early Soviet productions of the full-length work at the Mariinsky Theatre.

Svetlana Zakharova and Dmitry Semionov of the Kirov/Mariinsky Ballet in the Le Corsaire pas de deux. St. Petersburg, 2002. Photo by Marc Haegeman.

Gusev's revival premiered on 31 May 1955, and went on to become the most popular version of Le Corsaire in Russia. In 1977 the director of the Kirov Ballet, Oleg Vinogradov, staged Gusev's version for the company, who still retain the production in their repertory. The Novosibirsk Ballet also includes Gusev's version in their repertory. In 2009 the Mikhailovsky Theatre Ballet staged Gusev's version as revised by artistic director of ballet Farouk Ruzimatov.

The Kirov Ballet's staging of Gusev's version of Le Corsaire was given a new production in 1989 for the company's engagement at New York's Metropolitan Opera House. A performance of the new production was filmed that same year at the Mariinsky Theatre with the ballerina Altynai Asylmuratova as Medora, Yevgeny Neff as Conrad, Konstantin Zaklinsky as Isaac Lankendem, Yelena Pankova as Gulnare, and Farouk Ruzimatov as Ali. This film has been released onto DVD/video.

=== Konstantin Sergeyev's revival of 1973 ===
In 1973, the ballet master of the Kirov Ballet, Konstantin Sergeyev, staged his own version of Le Corsaire that included new pieces and updated choreography. Sergeyev included a new variation for the characters Conrad and Birbanto in act 1, fashioned from themes taken from Adam's original score.

Sergeyev's revival was pulled from the Kirov Ballet's repertory after only nine performances. It has been said that the Ballet Master had fallen into disfavor with the Soviet government due to the defections from the U.S.S.R. of Natalia Makarova and Mikhail Baryshnikov, Makarova's defection having caused his dismissal from the post of artistic director in 1970.

The full-length Le Corsaire was not performed again by the Kirov Ballet until 1977, when Oleg Vinogradov (the Kirov Ballet's artistic director from 1977) staged Pyotr Gusev's 1955 version. In 1989 the Kirov Ballet decided to present a revival of Le Corsaire for its upcoming world tour. There was much debate as to whether Vinogradov's staging of Gusev's version would be retained or whether Sergeyev's version would be reinstated. In the end the company chose to retain the Gusev version, which the company still performs regularly.

In 1992 Yuri Grigorovich, director of the Bolshoi Ballet of Moscow, invited Sergeyev to mount his 1973 revival of Le Corsaire for the company. This production—which included a heavily re-edited and re-orchestrated score by the Bolshoi Theatre's conductor Alexander Sotnikov—premiered on 11 March 1992 to great success, but after only seven performances Grigorovich decided to pull the production from the repertory. After witnessing the success of Sergeyev's production, Grigorovich decided to stage his own version, which premiered on 16 February 1994. Grigorovich's production was then taken out of the repertory after the director left the company in 1995.

=== Sergeyev's version is staged in the United States ===
The sets and costumes designed by Irina Tibilova for Konstantin Sergeyev's 1992 Moscow production sat unused in the archives of the Bolshoi Theatre for almost five years. At the suggestion of Sergeyev's wife, Natalia Dudinskaya, Anna-Marie Holmes staged Sergeyev's 1992 production for the Boston Ballet (with the assistance of Dudinskaya, Tatiana Terekhova, Sergei Berezhnoi, Tatiana Legat, and Vadim Disnitsky).

Nearly one year later, American Ballet Theatre rented and ultimately bought the Boston Ballet's production of Le Corsaire. The staging went through even more revisions both choreographically and musically, with modifications performed by American Ballet Theatre conductor Charles Barker and the company pianist Henrietta Stern. A run of performances at the Orange County Performing Arts Center resulted in the release of a DVD.

=== Bavarian State Ballet's revival of Le Corsaire ===
On 26 January 2006, the Bayerisches Staatsballett (Bavarian State Ballet) presented a partial reconstruction of Petipa's 1899 revival of Le Corsaire with additional choreography by Ivan Liska. For this production, twenty-five of Petipa's original dances were reconstructed from the Stepanov Choreographic Notation of the Sergeyev Collection by Doug Fullington. Modifications of the music-score by Maria Babanina. Set and costumes: Roger Kirk.

=== The Bolshoi Ballet's revival of 2007 ===
On 21 June 2007 the Bolshoi Ballet presented a lavish revival of Petipa's Le Corsaire staged by Alexei Ratmansky with new choreography, which included some reconstructed elements of Petipa's dances as staged for his 1899 revival reconstructed from the choreographic notation of the Sergeyev Collection by Yuri Burlaka (also responsible for the music dramaturgy conception). Set: Boris Kaminsky, Costumes: Elena Zaitseva.

=== English National Ballet 2013 ===
The English National Ballet became the first British ballet company to perform Le Corsaire as a complete work, in a production staged by Anna-Marie Holmes, completely re-imagined with original designs and costumes, plus a reworked score and new orchestrations. The production toured the UK visiting theatres in Milton Keynes, Southampton, Oxford, Bristol and Manchester, including a London season at the London Coliseum and was filmed for digital distribution by Digital Theatre. ENB had performed in Royal Opera House Muscat, Oman on 10,11,12 March 2016. The outreach team had given an excellent pre performance talk which made good understanding for the multi cultural spectators

== See also ==
- Il corsaro, an opera by Giuseppe Verdi, also based on Lord Byron's poem.
