= The Fountain of Bakhchisarai (ballet) =

Ballet to music by Boris Asafyev

The Fountain of Bakhchisarai (Russian: Бахчисарайский фонтан) is a full-length ballet in four acts, choreographed by Rostislav Zakharov to music by Boris Asafyev. The libretto by Nikolai Volkov is based on the 1823 poem of the same title by Alexander Pushkin. The ballet premiered on 28 September 1934 at the Kirov Academic Theatre of Opera and Ballet, with Galina Ulanova as Maria, Olga Iordan as Zarema, Mikhail Dudko as Khan Girey, and Konstantin Sergeyev as Vaslav.

Bakhchysarai is in the Crimea, near Yalta. The Bakhchisaray Palace was originally built in the sixteenth century and has been repeatedly destroyed and rebuilt since. The fountain, which still stands in a courtyard, is called the Fountain of Tears.

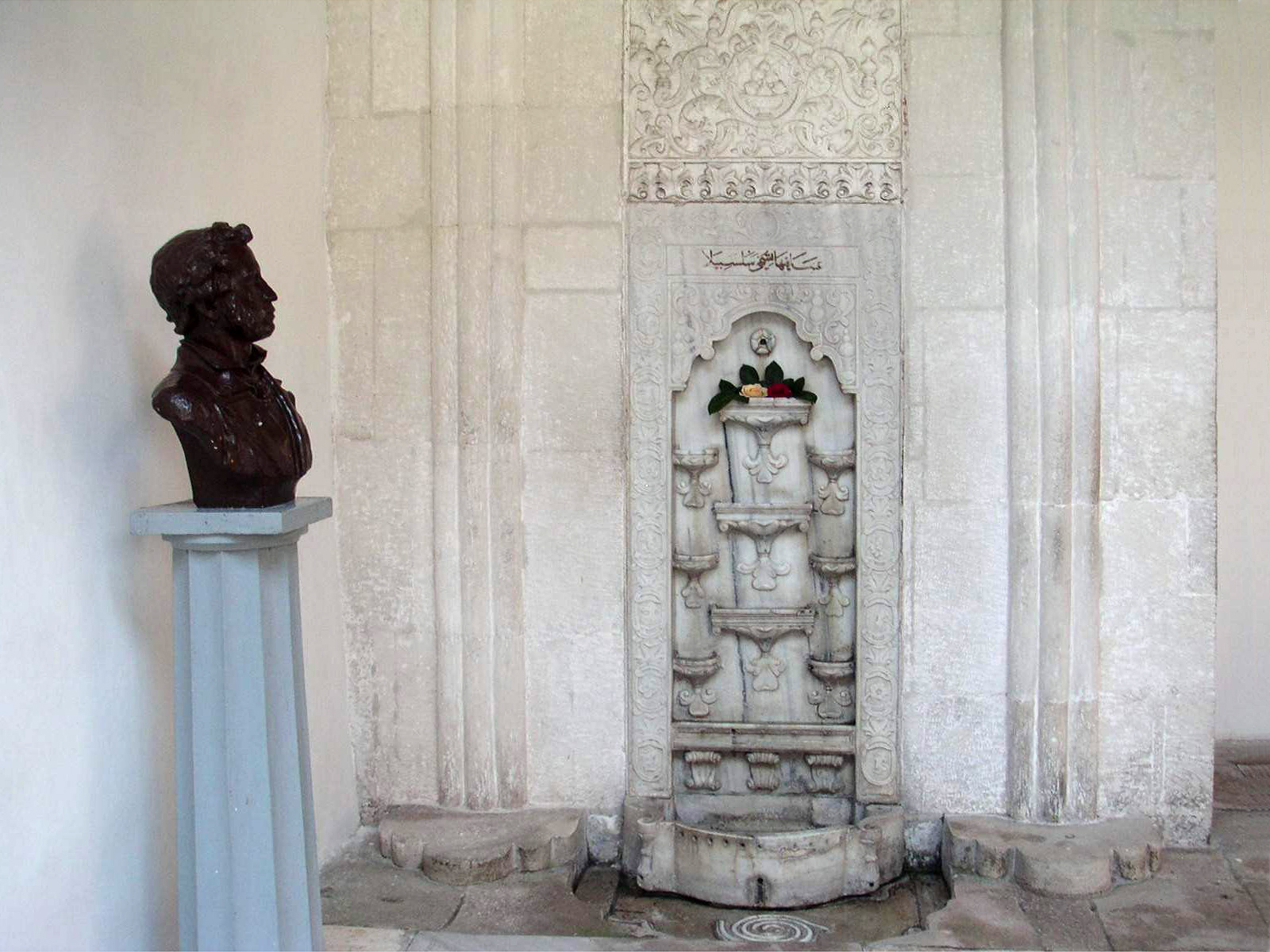
A bust of Pushkin beside the Fountain of Tears at Bakhchisaray Palace.

== Synopsis ==
The ballet opens at Bakhchisarai Palace, where Khan Girey is seated surrounded by his court. Dancers try to entertain him but he is oblivious to his surroundings, staring at water trickling from a fountain.

The scene shifts back in time to the palace of a Polish nobleman, where a ball is being held for the engagement of Maria, the daughter of the house, to the young noble Vaslav. Suddenly lurking Tartars led by Khan Girey scale the walls and attack the guests. After a vicious fight in which the Khan kills Vaslav, the palace is looted and torched and the women carried away as part of the booty. Maria hides her face, but the Khan tears away her scarf and is mesmerized by her beauty.

The Khan and his warriors return to Bakhchisarai Palace where he is greeted by Zarema, his harem favorite. While Zarema, who obviously loves him, is overjoyed at his return, the Khan ignores her completely in his preoccupation with Maria. He has Maria installed in an apartment isolated from the harem and visits her there. Laying his heart at her feet he tries to make her love him, but Maria is appalled and rejects him. In their brief struggle the Khan's hat falls to the floor. The Khan returns to the court where Zarema tries to win his attention by dancing for him, but he rejects her and she collapses in despair.

During the night Zarema steals out of the harem and past the guards to visit Maria in her chamber. She tries to tell Maria how desperately she loves the Khan, finally drawing a concealed dagger to stab her unwilling rival. At first afraid, Maria stands before Zarema and opens her arms wide, showing Zarema that she would welcome death. Zarema is stunned and falls to the ground. Maria tries to comfort her, but Zarema has seen the Khan's hat on the floor. Fearing the worst, she is again inflamed with jealousy. As the Khan and his guards rush in to try and stop her, Zarema breaks free and stabs Maria to death. The Khan draws his own dagger to kill Zarema, but she kneels down in front of him and offers her chest to the knife, just as Maria did. The Khan cannot kill her, but commands the guards to take her away to be flung to her death from the palace walls.

In the court, Khan Girey sits, devastated, and stares at the Fountain of Tears, as his orders are carried out.

== Popular culture ==
The Stars of the Russian Ballet is a 1953 Soviet film production that includes abridged versions of Swan Lake, The Fountain of Bakhchisarai and Flames of Paris.

In the film the roles were danced by Galina Ulanova (Maria), Maya Plisetskaya (Zarema), Pyotr Gusev (Khan Girey), and Yuri Zhdanov (Vaslav). This is the only known footage of Ulanova and Plisetskaya, who succeeded Ulanova as prima ballerina assoluta of the Bolshoi Theatre, dancing together.

== Reviews ==
- NY Times, by Anna Kisselgoff, Saturday, July 10, 1999

=== film reviews ===
- NY Times, September 6, 1954
- NY Times by Jennifer Dunning,: January 29, 1984
