= Vera Tsignadze =

Soviet ballet dancer (1924–2016)

- Georgian: ვერა ვარლამის ასული წიგნაძე
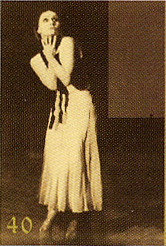
- Vera Tsignadze from a Georgian stamp.
- Born: Vera Varlamovna Tsignadze; 24 September 1924; Baku, Azerbaijan SSR, Transcaucasian SSR, Soviet Union
- Died: 17 July 2016 (aged 91); Tbilisi, Georgia
- Occupations: Dancer, choreographer, pedagogue
- Years active: 1943–2016
- Awards: Order of Lenin, 1958; Stalin Prize, 1948; Stalin Prize, 1951

Vera Varlamovna Tsignadze (Georgian: ვერა ვარლამის ასული წიგნაძე; 24 September 1924 – 17 July 2016) was a Georgian-Soviet ballet dancer, choreograph and pedagogue. Signadze was the partner of Vakhtang Chabukiani until 1970.

== Life ==
Vera Varlamovna Tsignadze was born on 24 September 1924 in Baku, capital of Azerbaijan SSR, then part of the Transcaucasian SSR, one of the soviet republics of then Soviet Union. In 1943 she graduated from the Baku Choreography School and was accepted into troupe of the Mailov Theatre. She was part of the corps de ballet, but at the age of 16, she was working in "Raimonda" ballette, led by Russian composer, music teacher and conductor Alexander Glazunov. In 1946 she was accepted into Georgian National Opera Theater, and became the lead soloist. In 1948 she partnered with Vakhtang Chabukiani.

Vera Tsignadze's dancing style was distinguished by its technical characteristics and elegance. She has been on tours in major cities of the Soviet Union, as well as in the cities of France, United States, Spain, Brazil and Chile. In 1969 she started to teach dancing in the Tbilisi Choreography School.

Vera Tsignadze died on June 17, 2016, in Tbilisi, capital of Georgia.

== Awards ==
- Order of Honor (1995)
- Order of Lenin (17 April 1958)
- Order of the Red Banner of Labor (10 November 1950)
- Stalin Prize 1st class (1948)
- Stalin Prize 2nd class (1951)
- People's Artist of the Georgian SSR (1955)

== Legacy ==
In December 2005, Georgian Post issued a series of two stamps, titled "The Georgian Ballet". Vera Tsignadze's picture was issued on the first stamp, while Vakhtang Chabukiani's picture was issued on the second stamp.
