= Ninel Petrova =

Soviet and Russian ballerina (1924–2026)

- Born: 15 March 1924
- Died: 7 March 2026 (aged 101)
- Occupation: Ballerina

Ninel Petrova (15 March 1924 – 7 March 2026) was a Soviet and Russian ballerina. She performed in ballet choreographer Leonid Yakobson's Spartacus and Eternal Spring, and she was honored as a People's Artist of the Russian Federation. Petrova was born on 15 March 1924, and died on 7 March 2026, at the age of 101.
