= Tsar Kandavl or Le Roi Candaule =

1868 ballet by Marius Petipa

Le Roi Candaule
- Choreographer: Marius Petipa
- Music: Cesare Pugni
- Premiere: 29 October [O.S. 17 October] 1868 (Imperial Bolshoi Kamenny Theatre); St. Petersburg, Russia
- Genre: Grand ballet

Le Roi Candaule (en. King Candaules) is a Grand ballet in four acts and six scenes, with choreography by Marius Petipa and music by Cesare Pugni. The libretto is by Jules-Henri Vernoy de Saint-Georges and is based on the history of King Candaules the Ruler of Lydia, as described by Herodotus in his Histories.

== History ==
Le Roi Candaule was first presented by the Imperial Ballet on 29 October [O.S. 17 October] 1868 at the Imperial Bolshoi Kamenny Theatre, St. Petersburg, Russia. The ballet was a huge success, with Mlle. Henriette d'Or amazing the audience in her performance as Queen Nisia. Her incredible technical abilities were especially showcased in the celebrated Pas de Venus of the second act, in which she performed five pirouettes sur la pointe, which caused a great sensation among the audience.

Two months later, Petipa moved his ballet to Moscow, where it was premièred on December 22, 1868, at the Imperial Bolshoi Theatre and it continued to be performed in Moscow and St. Petersburg with great success over the years. Petipa first revived the ballet in 1891 with additional music by Riccardo Drigo. This revival was first presented on 6 December [O.S. 24 November] 1891 at the Imperial Mariinsky Theatre, St. Petersburg, Russia. His final revival was premiered at the Imperial Mariinsky Theatre on 21 April [O.S. 8 April] 1903.

Le Roi Candaule was notated in the Stepanov notation method and is part of the Sergeyev Collection, which is housed at the Harvard University Theatre Library Collection.

== Roles ==
Role	St Petersburg 1868	St Petersburg 1891	St Petersburg 1903
King Candaules	Felix Kschessinsky	Pavel Gerdt	Pavel Gerdt
Queen Nisia	Henriette d'Or	Carlotta Brianza	Julia Sedova
Gyges	Lev Ivanov	Alexander Gorsky	Georgy Kyaksht
Clytia	Klavdia Kantsyreva	Varvara Rykhliakova	Nadezhda Petipa
Pythia			Evdokia Vasilieva

== Synopsis ==
ACT 1

Scene 1 - A forest glade. In the background is the cave of Pythia of Sardis

The kings and people of Lydia come to this spot to question the oracle as to the future.

At the rise of the curtain, peasants, shepherds and shepherdesses come to rest on the grass after their toil. Among them is a shepherd called Gyges, who plays on his pipe and induces the company to dance. Near him is his betrothed, Clytia, who looks at him tenderly. Gradually the light fades. The peasants look fearfully at the cave and take their departure. Night falls.

Follows the hooting of owls and the whistling of bats. Pythia emerges from the cave amid clouds of smoke and, knowing that King Candaules is about to consult her, commands everyone to leave.

King Candaules enters, escorted by his followers. Gyges, whom the king encountered in the forest, acts as his guide. He informs the King that if he wishes to consult the oracle, he must strike the shield that hangs beside Pythia's cave. Gyges and the King's attendants retire. Candaules strikes the shield and Pythia appears. He entreats her to cast his future.

She tells him that he kidnapped the true king in his infancy, placed him in the forest at the mercy of wild beasts and seized the crown himself. Candaules, alarmed, protests that she is mistaken. Pythia offers to retract her words if he will submit to the judgement of Heaven. She raises her arms in readiness, but Candaules, afraid, implies his guilt. Then Pythia informs him that the true king lives and will seize his throne and power. Candaules swears to kill the king if he be alive.

Pythia bids Candaules walk in fear of the gods. Owls appear carrying in their claws a roll of papyrus, which predicts that Candaules will die an unnatural death. Terrified, he flees into the forest.

Gyges returns and is surprised no to find the King, but Pythia takes him by the hand, bids him put on the armour left by Candaules and foretells that he will soon be king. Gyges obeys her and, becoming conscious of his destiny, waves his sword and disappears into the forest.

Scene 2 - King Candaules's camp on the borders of Libya and Misia. There are numerous tents with the King's abode in the centre. In the distance are mountains. Night

There is considerable activity. Sentries are being changed, soldiers are furbishing armour and officers are passing in and out of the King's tent for their orders.

The flap is thrown back and Candaules emerges. His Queen, Nisia, with the aid of her women, put on armour. She is attended by Amazons and, under her direction, warlike games are played; meanwhile, Candaules's warriors practise the testudo. The games end and silence reigns. Suddenly, a messenger gives a warning of a night attack. Candaules orders everyone to be on the alert and a warrior, Gyges, is placed at the entrance of the tent.

In the half-darkness, troops can be seen creeping along the ground. The surprise the guards and gradually near the King's tent. Then the enemy leap to their feet and begin to destroy the tents. They are impressed by the splendour of the King's tent, which Gyges forbids them to enter. Nisia raises the flap and faces the enemy. Two of her assailants endeavour to capture the Queen, but Gyges cuts them down. Other soldiers attack Gyges, who is almost overcome when a party of Candaule's men come to the rescue, led by the King.

Seeing his wife in Gyges's arms, Candaules takes the warrior for an enemy and rushes upon him with an upraised dagger, but Nisia explains that Gyges has saved her life. Candaules thanks Gyges warmly and announces that henceforth, he shall rank next to him. Everyone does homage to Gyges, who, however, cannot accustom himself to this high honour.

ACT 2

An arena with a triumphal arch. In the background is a statue of Venus Victrix. On either side are tiers of seats with places of honour for the King and Queen and their suite

Citizens of all rank, carrying laurel wreaths and flowers, are seen arriving to greet the King, whose approach is heralded by fanfares. The Lydian warriors enter through the arch, followed by captive chiefs in chains and captive soldiers of various nations. The rear of the procession is formed by the notables of Lydia, and a gold chariot drawn by slaves. In this chariot are King Candaules, Gyges and the principal ministers. Nisia follows on a magnificently accoutred elephant. She is surrounded by girls who rain down flowers.

The triumphal procession stops at the centre of the arena. The nobles offer their King the keys of his capital, then the captives are paraded before him. Finally, Candaules, accompanied by Nisia, takes his seat and the festival begins.

First, there is a dance by nymphs, bayadères and graces. Just before the dance ends, a Lydian representing a sunflower and surrounded by other dancers representing roses and forget-me-nots treads a measure. Nisia is entreated to take part and represent Venus.

At first, she refuses, then consents. A new dance begins in which Nisia, cupids, nymphs and sylphs take part. Everyone does homage to the new Venus and Candaules, drunk with pride, declares his consort to be the true Venus. Nisia declines these compliments, but Candaules orders the statue of Venus to be removed from its pedestal and Nisia lifted in its place. Candaules and his courtiers acclaim her as a goddess. The warriors present arms and the women strew flowers at her feet. All at once, the sky grows dark and the priests and people look away in fear, while Candaules, in his arrogance, seems to defy the powers of Heaven.

ACT 3

The Queen's bathing-place. Splendid tables are laid with gold dishes. In the background is a bathing-pool of pink and while marble, adorned with a fountain and surrounded with flowers

Nisia is seen standing beneath a curtain and attended by female slaves. They dress her hair and remove her jewels. Others hold up a mirror in which she admires herself. To the music of harps, the slaves take up a series of attitudes and afterwards, Nisia dances. During the last group, a curtain falls and masks the bathing-pool.

The Queen's ladies enter and prepare to receive her. Nisia arrives, splendidly attired and attended by many slaves. The arrival of Candaules is announced. He kneels before the Queen whom he has elevated to a goddess. He is surrounded by the women who attempt to fascinate him.

Suddenly, Gyges runs in distraught, for he is the bearer of evil news. He is followed by the priests of Venus who demand an audience with the King. Candaules, alarmed, orders them to be admitted. The priests are afraid, for Venus has already given signs of her displeasure, since hunger, pestilence and other miseries have fallen on the land and are spreading throughout Lydia.

The King asks the High Priest how the goddess can be appeased. He replies that the goddess insists that Nisia shall be punished by being forced the renounce her title of Queen. Nisia is terrified and the King refuses the demand. Then the Priest warns him to beware of the anger of the gods. The sky darkens, thunder rolls, lightning flashes and the tremor of an earthquake is felt.

Candaules induces Nisia to renounce her title and she flings her gold circlet to the ground. The King falls on his knees and swears eternal love. The sky clears and the Priest returns thanks to Heaven, but Nisia looks contemptuously at Candaules and seeks consolation from her women.

ACT 4

Scene 1 - The bedchamber of King Candaules

The King is seen asleep on a couch. Nisia sits beside a table on which rests his crown. She gazes sadly on this symbol of earthly power, conscious of the gloomy future that lies before her. Then she looks at Candaules, the cause of her fall.

In her anger, she menaces the sleeping King. At the same moment, a curtain parts and Pythia appears, bearing a golden cup. She tells Nisia that it contains poison and urges her to satisfy her revenge, for Gyges will marry her and she will again become a Queen. A vision of Gyges is seen at the far end of the room.

Candaules awakes and Pythia disappears. Courtiers enter, including Gyges. All pass by Nisia without noticing her, save only Gyges who bows before her as usual. Nisia conceals her displeasure, but vows vengeance, Candaules, still in love with his wife, tries to calm her. He asks her to dance for him. She consents, but asks him to send everyone away, since she is a slave now and only he may see her dance. At Candaules's command, the courtiers retire.

Nisia dances and soon captivates the amorous king. He tries to embrace her, but she eludes him. Meanwhile, Pythia watches behind a curtain and points to the poisoned cup. Nisia takes it and presents it to Candaules with averted eyes. The King drains the cup. He feels the effects of the poison and strikes a gong, but Pythia appears. As Candaules writhes in the throes of death, Gyges and his courtiers rush in. Gyges goes to help the King, but Pythia forces him to confess that Gyges is the rightful monarch. Gyges takes the King's crown and presents it to Nisia who, surprised, looks at Pythia, who reminds her of her prediction.

Scene 2 - A hall in the palace of King Candaules. On the terrace is a table laid with gold dishes. The hall is lit with bronze scones

A betrothal feast is in progress, for Gyges has become King of Lydia and is to wed Nisia. Courtiers and nobles are present. The priests enter to conduct the marriage ceremony. They bring a sacrificial table. Gyges, crowned, leads his bride towards the table, places a hand over the holy flame and takes a vow. Nisia does the same, but the flame expires and there is a clap of thunder. The people are astonished at this portent and the priests withdraw from the table. Gyges, enraptured with Nisia, ignores the warning, takes the Queen towards the gardens and commands the festival to begin. The proceedings open with the Dance of Diana, in which Endymion and a satyr take part. Slaves wait on the guests who are reclining at the tables and fill their cups with wine.

Gyges asks the Queen to join in the dancing. She takes a cup and empties it as if to drown her thoughts. She dances in a trance and empties another cup, which is filled by the ghost of Candaules, who suddenly tears the crown from her head. Terrified, she swoons and Gyges hurries to her side and endeavours to lead her to her throne, but again, the ghost appears. Nisia, panic-stricken, runs among the dancers, who cannot see the reason for her fear. At last, exhausted, she falls in Gyges's arms, but the ghost points to his grave, where he awaits his guilty wife. A deathly pallor steals over her features and she sinks to the ground dead. Gyges, overcome with grief, tries to restore her to life. At this moment, Pythia appears. She tells Gyges not to grieve, but to thank Heaven for having preserved him from death and she indicates a cup of poison that Nisia had prepared for him.

Gyges and all present withdraw from Nisia's body. A blue sky appears and in a diamond temple, Venus is seen surrounded by cupids. The jealous goddess, with an expression of triumph, points to Nisia's lifeless body, as if to warn those who seek to rival the goddess of eternal beauty.

== The Diana and Actaeon pas de deux ==
In 1935, Agrippina Vaganova mounted a new revival of La Esmeralda at the Kirov Theatre. For the second act of the ballet, Vaganova added a divertissement take from Le Roi Candaule known as the Pas de Diane, which for unknown reasons she re-named the Diane et Actéon Pas de deux. Vaganova revised Petipa's original scheme for the pas, which was originally a pas de trois for the Goddess Diana, the shepherd Endymion and a Satyr. The new version served as a virtuoso pas de deux for Galina Ulanova as Diana and Vakhtang Chabukiani as Actaeon.

The original title of this pas was called the Pas de Diane and was originally a pas de trois danced by Diana the Roman Goddess of the Hunt, Endymion the shepherd and a satyr, reflecting the myth of the passion between Diana and Endymion. It is believed that Petipa's inspiration for this pas was a painting by the Russian painter, Karl Bryullov. The traditional version that is danced today is not by Petipa, but by Agrippina Vaganova, who staged her own version of the Pas de Diane when she transferred it into a revival of La Esmeralda in 1935. She altered the scheme by removing the role of the satyr and changing the lead male role to the hunter, Actaeon, with whom Diana dances in the company of twelve of her nymphs. This was a very strange change on Vaganova's part since Diana and Actaeon were not lovers, but had one association when he stumbled upon her bathing naked with her nymphs, after which, she transformed him into a stag and he was hunted down and killed by his own hunting dogs.

However, Petipa's original scheme and Bryullov's painting also contain a mythological inaccuracy in that they both erroneously portray Endymion as the lover of Diana; this is an inaccuracy that appears in several ballets, including Léo Delibes's Sylvia. In fact, Endymion was the lover of Luna the Roman Goddess of the Moon (Selene in Greek mythology) and never had any association with Diana at all. Diana's famous love interest was actually the Titan hunter, Orion.
