= Natalia Dudinskaya =

Soviet ballet dancer (1912–2003)

- Наталия Дудинская
- Born: August 8, 1912; Kharkiv, Russian Empire (present-day Ukraine)
- Died: January 29, 2003 (aged 90); Saint Petersburg, Russia
- Resting place: Literatorskiye Mostki, Saint Petersburg
- Occupation: Ballet dancer

Natalia Mikhailovna Dudinskaya (Note: Russian: Наталия Михайловна Дудинская, romanized: Nataliya Mikhaylovna Dudinskaya; Ukrainian: Наталія Михайлівна Дудинська, romanized: Nataliia Mykhailivna Dudynska) (21 August [O.S. 8 August] 1912 – 29 January 2003) was a Russian ballet dancer during the Soviet era, renowned for her work as a prima ballerina at the Kirov Ballet from the 1930s to the 1950s.

== Biography ==
Dudinskaya was born on 21 August [O.S. 8 August] 1912, in Kharkiv. Her mother was Natalia Taliori, a Ukrainian and Russian ballerina who had been coached by Enrico Cecchetti. Trained by Agrippina Vaganova, Dudinskaya matriculated from her school in 1931. She danced all the classical leads at the Kirov Theatre including the starring role in Cinderella. She later originated leading roles in Boris Asafyev's Flames of Paris and Taras Bulba. She was best known in La Bayadère, Don Quixote and in the title role of the eponymous Laurencia, which she originated. She was frequently partnered by her husband, Konstantin Sergeyev, famed Georgian dancer Vakhtang Chabukiani and, at the end of her career, a 21-year-old Rudolf Nureyev who she picked to partner her in Laurencia. Frail health forced her to retire in 1961. She did, however dance in her husband's 1964 film version of Sleeping Beauty in the role of Carabosse. During her career, she received a total of four Stalin Prizes. In 1957 she was named a People's Artist of the USSR.

Upon her retirement, Dudinskaya became the ballet mistress of the Kirov Ballet and one of the most famed teachers at the Vaganova Institute. After Nureyev's defection to the West in 1961, she and her husband, Konstantin Sergeyev, were subjected to reprimands from Soviet officials. They ultimately lost their company positions after the defection of Natalia Makarova in 1970 but Dudinskaya continued to teach up and coming dancers. Anastasia Volochkova and Ulyana Lopatkina were among the last ballerinas coached by her. Dudinskaya also helped her husband stage his productions of Russian classics outside Russia, turning up at the Boston Ballet, for example, in the 1980s and 1990s to work on Giselle, Swan Lake, La Bayadère and Le Corsaire. She died in Saint Petersburg on 29 January 2003 at the age of 90.
