= Agrippina Vaganova =

Russian ballerina and teacher (1879–1951)

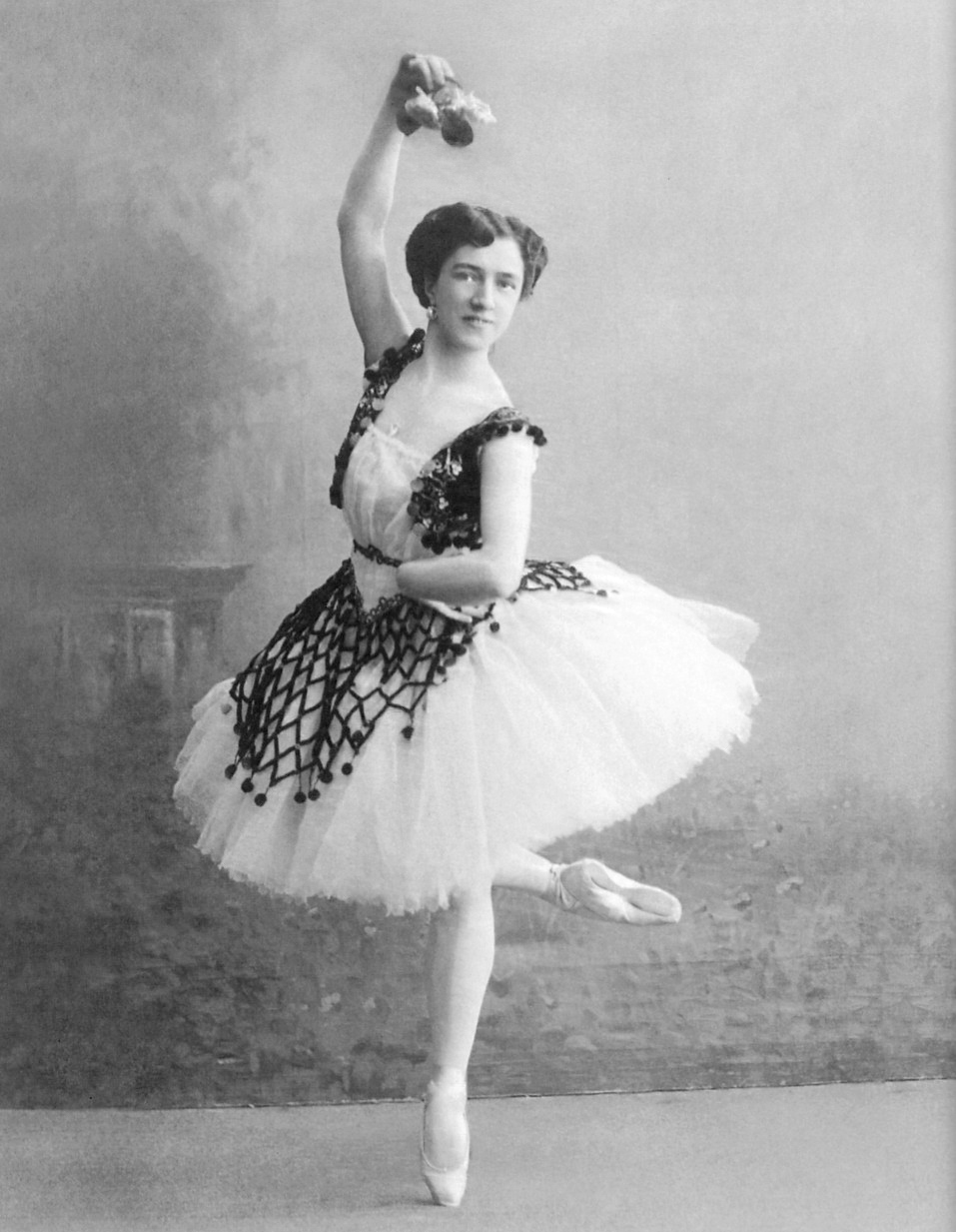
- Agrippina Vaganova in the pas de trois from Paquita. Saint Petersburg, c. 1910.
- Born: 26 June 1879; Saint Petersburg, Russia
- Died: 5 November 1951 (aged 72); Leningrad, Soviet Union
- Occupations: Ballet dancer; teacher

Agrippina Yakovlevna Vaganova (Russian: Агриппи́на Я́ковлевна Вага́нова; 26 June 1879 – 5 November 1951) was a Russian and Soviet ballet teacher who developed the Vaganova method – the technique which derived from the teaching methods of the old Imperial Ballet School (today the Vaganova Academy of Russian Ballet) under the Premier Maître de Ballet Marius Petipa throughout the mid to late 19th century, though mostly throughout the 1880s and 1890s. It was Vaganova who perfected and cultivated this form of teaching the art of classical ballet into a workable syllabus. Her Fundamentals of the Classical Dance (1934) remains a standard textbook for the instruction of ballet technique. Her technique is one of the most popular ones today.

== Biography ==
Vaganova was born in Saint Petersburg to Akop Vaganov, an Armenian from Astrakhan, who worked as an usher at the Mariinsky Theatre, and a Russian mother.

Vaganova's whole life was connected with the Imperial Ballet (later the Kirov Ballet) of the Mariinsky Theatre in Saint Petersburg. She was accepted into the Imperial Ballet School in 1888, the great institution of classical dance founded by Anna of Russia and funded by the tsars. She graduated from the classe de perfection of the former prima ballerina Evgenia Pavlovna Sokolova (she was also trained by Yekaterina Vazem, Christian Johansson, Lev Ivanov, Nikolai Legat and Pavel Gerdt).

Ballet did not come easily to Vaganova in her first years as a student, but slowly, through the efforts of her own will power, she was able to join the illustrious Imperial Ballet upon her graduation. By the time she attained the rank of soloist, Saint Petersburg balletomanes dubbed her queen of variations, for her virtuosity and level of technique.

The old Maestro Petipa cared little for Vaganova as a dancer – any mention of her performances in his diaries was usually followed by such comments as "awful" or "dreadful". In 1915 the Ballet Master Nikolai Legat cast Vaganova as the goddess Niriti in his revival of Petipa's 1889 grand ballet The Talisman. Vaganova's portrayal was a great success, and won her promotion to the rank of Prima. Nevertheless, she chose to retire one year later to concentrate on teaching.

She started to teach ballet in 1916 at the School of the Baltic Fleet which was founded and led by Akim Volynsky. In 1921, Vaganova began teaching at the Choreographic College, so at that time was called the former Imperial Theatre School situated on Rossi Street (after the revolution, the ballet department was separated from the drama and the music departments). Though she did have a respectable career as a dancer, her leadership in teaching classical dance was what gave her one of the most respected places in the history of ballet. Her own early struggle with deciphering ballet technique had taught her much. She taught students who would go on to become legends of the dance.

After the October Revolution the future of ballet in Russia looked grim because of its tradition as court entertainment. Vaganova "fought tooth and nail", as she put it, for the preservation of the legacy of Marius Petipa and the Imperial Ballet. From 1931 to 1937 she was an artistic director of the ballet of the Leningrad Opera and Ballet Theatre (Kirov Ballet). In 1933, she staged the classical version of Swan Lake by Lev Ivanov and Marius Petipa with Galina Ulanova as Odette, Olga Jordan as Odile and Konstantin Sergeyev as Prince Siegfried. In 1935, she revived La Esmeralda, partly with her own choreography.

In 1934, she published her famous book Fundamentals of Classical Dance: it has withstood at least six editions in Russia and was translated into many languages. The same year Vaganova (along with Boris Shavrov) initiated the establishing at the Leningrad Conservatory of pedagogic department for training of future ballet teachers which she began to manage. There, some of her dance school alumni became her students. Most important names for the dance teaching are Vera Kostrovitskaya (author of 100 Lessons of Classical Dance and The School of Classical Dance with A. Pisarov), Nadezhda Bazarova and Varvara P. Mey (authors of the Alphabet of Classical Dance).

Among Vaganova's dance alumnae were the distinguished Soviet ballerinas Marina Semyonova, Olga Jordan, Galina Ulanova, Tatiana Vecheslova, Feya Balabina, Natalia Dudinskaya, Galina Kirillova, Alla Shelest, Ninel Petrova, Nonna Yastrebova, Olga Moiseeva, Lyudmila Safronova, Ninel Kurgapkina, Alla Osipenko and Irina Kolpakova among many others.

Her teaching combined the elegant, refined style of the old French School which Vaganova had been taught by Christian Johansson, the beauty and smoothness of the arms movements of old Russian School, strong and masterly foot technique of Italian School with more vigorous dancing developed in the Soviet Union. Her last school graduation was in 1951 — not long before her death.

She also taught the class of perfection for the female dancers of the Kirov Ballet for many years till 1951, when Natalia Dudinskaya succeed her as teacher.

Shortly after her death, on 1 November 1951, the Choreographic College on Rossi Street was renamed in her honour; in 1961, it received the title of "academic", and in 1991, it began to use the name Vaganova Academy of Russian Ballet.

The spread of the Vaganova method is not limited to Russia. It has been widely used as a ballet training method in Ukraine, Germany, and China. The State Ballet School of Berlin is a ballet school in Germany that adopts the Vaganova method. There is a growing trend among American ballet schools to adopt the Vaganova method as their training method.

== See also ==
- List of dancers
- List of Russian ballet dancers
