= Konstantin Sergeyev =

Russian dancer (1910–1992)

Konstantin Mikhailovich Sergeyev (Russian: Константин Михайлович Сергеев; 5 March [O.S. 20 February] 1910 – 1 April 1992) was a Soviet and Russian ballet dancer, ballet master, pedagogue and choreographer for the Kirov Theatre. When the Kirov Ballet returned to Leningrad from Perm (where it had been moved during the war), Sergeyev became the head choreographer of the company. His first major work was to re-stage Sergei Prokofiev's Cinderella, which is still performed in the present day.

His teachers at Leningrad State Choreographic Institute were Mariya Kozhukhova, Vladimir Ponomaryov, and Viktor Semyonov (Marina Semyonova's first husband).

His first wife Feya Balabina was a prima ballerina of the Kirov ballet, as was his second wife Natalia Dudinskaya. He danced with Dudinskaya at the 1946 premiere of his Cinderella production for the Kirov.

Galina Ulanova was his partner between 1930 and 1940. Sergeyev and Ulanova were the first to dance Romeo and Juliet in Prokofiev's ballet of the same name.

== Awards and honors ==
- Honored Artist of the RSFSR (1939)
- Order of the Badge of Honour (1939)
- Order of the Red Banner of Labour (1940)
- Medal "For Valiant Labour in the Great Patriotic War 1941–1945" (1945)
- Three Stalin Prizes second degree (1947, 1949, 1951)
- Stalin Prize first degree (1946)
- People's Artist of the RSFSR (1951)
- Medal "In Commemoration of the 250th Anniversary of Leningrad" (1954)
- People's Artist of the USSR (1957)
- Four Orders of Lenin (1970, 1980, 1988, 1991)
- Hero of Socialist Labour (1991)

== See also ==
- List of Russian ballet dancers
