= Galina Ulanova =

Soviet and Russian ballerina (8 of January 1910-21 of March 1998) died age 88

- Галина Уланова
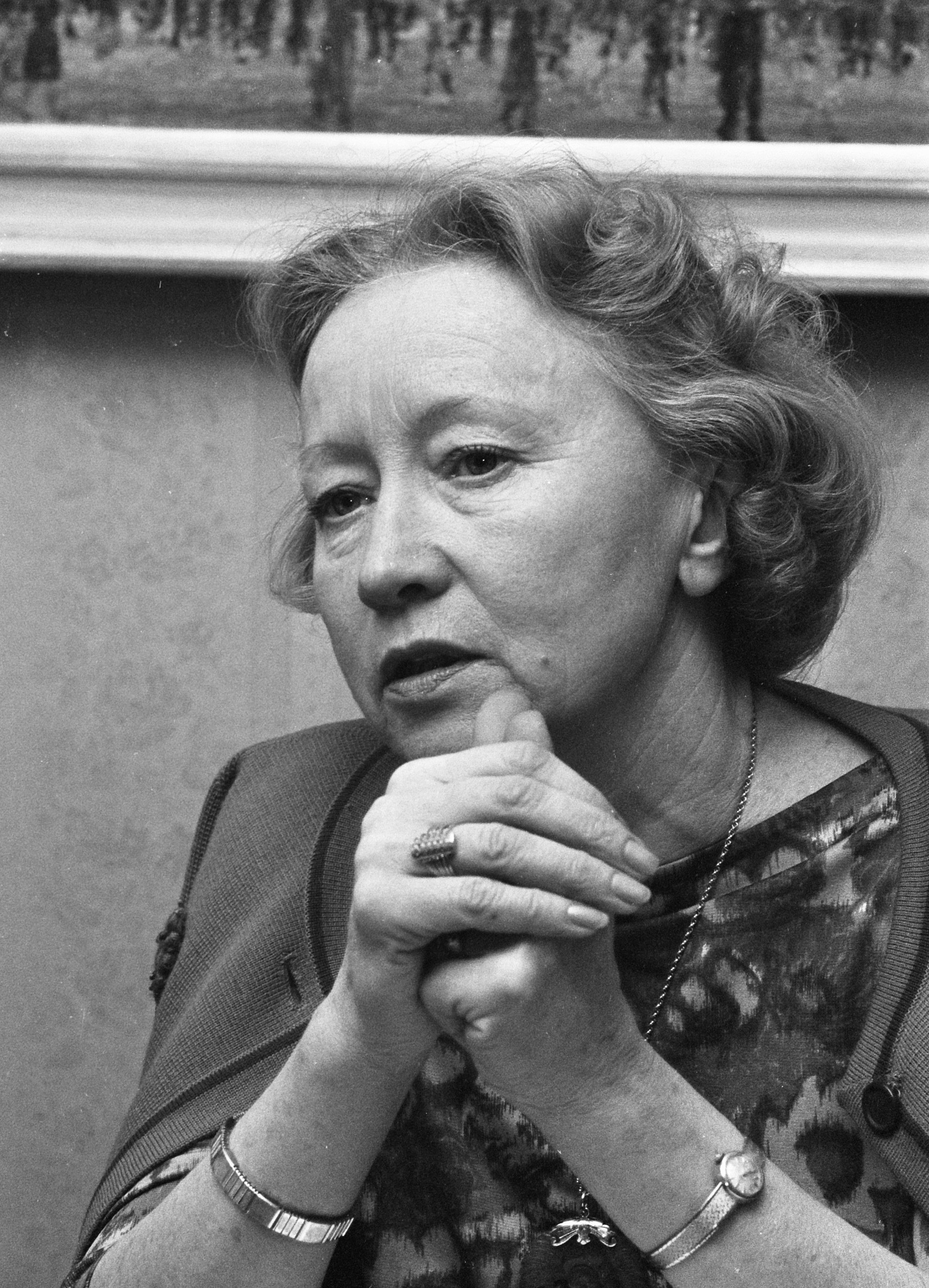
- Ulanova in 1968
- Born: 8 January 1910; Saint Petersburg, Russian Empire
- Died: 21 March 1998 (aged 88)
- Resting place: Novodevichy Cemetery, Moscow
- Occupation: Prima ballerina assoluta
- Employer(s): Mariinsky Theatre, Bolshoi Theatre
- Known for: Romeo and Juliet, Giselle, Swan Lake
- Awards: People's Artist of the USSR

Galina Sergeyevna Ulanova (Russian: Галина Сергеевна Уланова, pronounced [ɡɐˈlʲinə ʊˈlanəvə]; 8 January 1910 [O.S. 26 December 1909] – 21 March 1998) was a Russian ballet dancer. She is frequently cited as being one of the greatest ballerinas of the 20th century.

People's Artist of the USSR (1951), twice Hero of Socialist Labour (1974, 1980). Laureate of the Lenin Prize (1957) and four Stalin Prizes (1941, 1946, 1947, 1950). Recipient of four Orders of Lenin (1953, 1970, 1974, 1980). The most decorated ballerina in the history of Soviet ballet.

== Biography ==
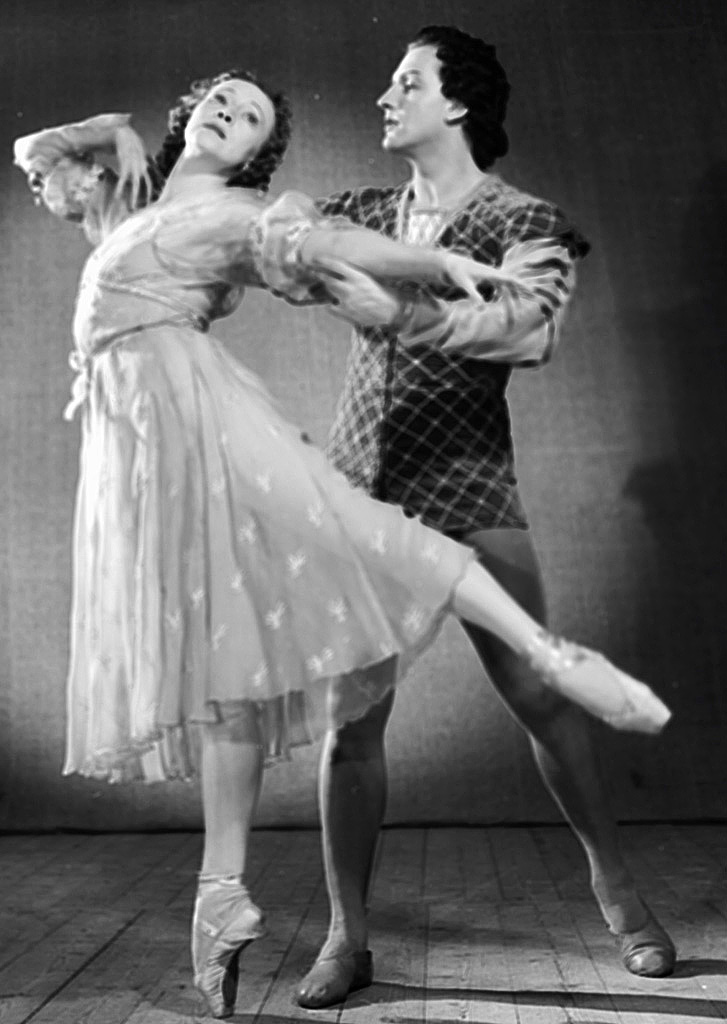
Ulanova with Yuri Zhdanov in Romeo and Juliet

Ulanova was born in Saint Petersburg, Russia. Both her parents were the soloists of the Mariinsky theatre and danced with Anna Pavlova. Later, her father became a director and her mother taught ballet. Ulanova recalled that she 'never had a choice to pick a career' and due to her parents' profession, ballet was her only option. As a child she dreamed of becoming a sailor, saying she feared having the life of artists with lots of labour and no sleep. Nevertheless, her parents sent her to ballet school at a very young age, where she studied under Agrippina Vaganova and her own mother.

When she joined the Mariinsky Theatre in 1928, the press found in her "much of Semyonova's style, grace, the same exceptional plasticity and a sort of captivating modesty in her gestures". Konstantin Stanislavsky, fascinated with her acting style, implored her to take part in his stage productions. In 1944, when her fame reached Joseph Stalin, he had her transferred to the Bolshoi Theatre, where she would be the prima ballerina assoluta for 16 years. The following year, she danced the title role in the world premiere of Sergei Prokofiev's Cinderella.

Ulanova was regarded as a great actress as well as a dancer, and when she was finally allowed to tour abroad at the age of 46, enraptured British papers wrote that "Galina Ulanova in London knew the greatest triumph of any individual dancer since Anna Pavlova". Having retired from the stage at the age of 50, she coached many generations of Russian dancers.

Ulanova was one of the few dancers to be awarded Hero of Socialist Labour and the only one to receive this honour twice. She was also awarded the highest exclusively artistic national title, People's Artist of the USSR. and she was awarded the Stalin Prize in 1941, 1946, 1947, 1950, and the Lenin Prize in 1957. She was elected a Foreign Honorary Member of the American Academy of Arts and Sciences in 1960.

She died in 1998 in Moscow, aged 88, and is buried in the cemetery of the Novodevichy Convent.

Ulanova's apartment in one of Moscow's Seven Sisters, the Kotelnicheskaya Embankment Building, is preserved now as a memorial museum. Monuments to Ulanova were erected in Saint Petersburg and Stockholm.

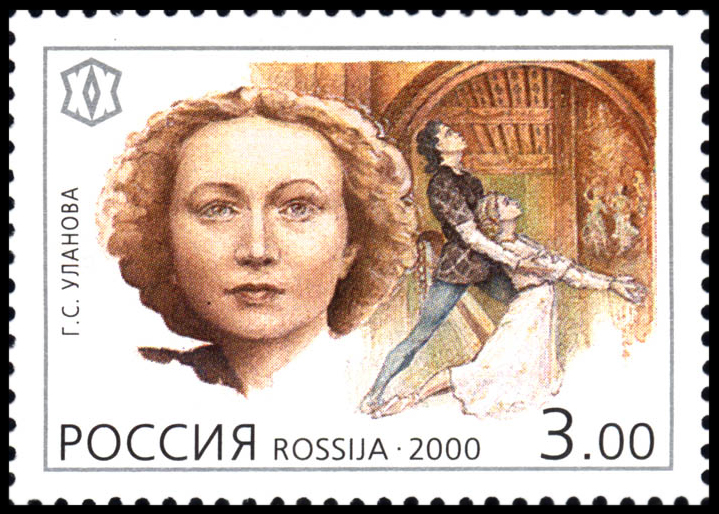
Ulanova on a Russian 3-ruble postage stamp issued in 2000.

== Opinions on Ulanova ==
- Sergei Eisenstein: "Ulanova — cannot be grouped together with, compared to other dancers. In terms of what is most cherished, By the very nature of her secret…She belongs to a different dimension."
- Sergey Prokofiev: "She is the genius of Russian ballet, its elusive soul, its inspired poetry. Ulanova imparts to her interpretation of classical roles a depth of expression unheard of in twentieth century ballet."
- Evgeny Mravinsky: "The image of Ulanova – gentle, fragile and wise – was given to me in my early youth and is rooted in my heart and memory forever. Each encounter with Ulanova and her art, each memory of her – is always a great thrill and happiness. With thanks to her and gratitude to Fate for having given her to us."
- Sviatoslav Richter: "Ulanova has charted new paths in ballet …Not only has she given us unforgettable characters, she has created her own artistic world – a realm of human spirituality… Ulanova has transformed ballet into a popular art form. Thanks to her even its most implacable enemies have become its supporters and thousands of people now acknowledge ballet to be a vital necessity."
- Margot Fonteyn: "I cannot even begin to talk about Ulanova's dancing, it is so marvelous, I am left speechless. It is magic. Now we know what we lack."
- Maya Plisetskaya: "Ulanova has created her own style, has schooled us to it. She represents an epoch, a time. She has her own hallmark. Like Mozart, Beethoven and Prokofiev she has had an impact, she has reflected her age."
- Arnold Haskell: "My memories of Ulanova are, to me, a part of life itself, bringing a total enrichment of experience. To me, hers are not theatrical miracles but triumphs of human spirit. Where Pavlova was supremely conscious of her audience and could play upon its emotions as upon an instrument, Ulanova is remote in a world of her own, which we are privileged to penetrate. She is so completely identified with the character she impersonates that nothing outside exists."
- Maya Plisetskaya: "She was an angel and she danced like one."
- Maurice Béjart: "Galina Ulanova is a ballerina who has grasped the profoundest secrets of art, she has united feelings and their outer expression into an indivisible whole."
- Rudolf Nureyev: "Only she, the world's Number One ballerina, kept unswervingly to her chosen course, always unassuming, modestly dressed, entirely absorbed in dance and totally unreceptive to backstage intrigue. Her inner strength, her human qualities – these explain why she has remained pure, untouched by the day-to-day hassle of theatre life."

== Honours and awards ==
=== Soviet Union ===
- Twice Hero of Socialist Labor (1974, 1980)
- Four awards of the Order of Lenin (1953, 1979, 1974, 1980)
- Four awards of the Order of Red Banner of Labor (1939, 1951, 1959, 1967)
- Order of the Badge of Honor (1940)
- Order of the Friendship of Peoples (1986)
- Honored Artist of the RSFSR (1939)
- People's Artist of the RSFSR (1940)
- People's Artist of the Kazakh SSR (1943)
- People's Artist of the USSR (1951)
- Stalin Prize first degree (1941) – for outstanding achievements in the field of ballet
- Stalin Prize first degree (1946) – for the performance of the title role in Cinderella by Prokofiev
- Stalin Prize first degree (1947) – for the performance of the title role in Romeo and Juliet by Prokofiev
- Stalin Prize second degree (1950) – for her interpretation of the Tao-Hoa in ballet The Red Poppy by Gliere
- Lenin Prize (1957)
- Medal "For the Defence of Leningrad"
- Medal "For Valiant Labor in the Great Patriotic War of 1941–1945"
- Award and the Gold Medal Exhibition Center (1971)

=== Russia ===
- Award of the President of the Russian Federation in the field of art and literature (1997)

=== Foreign ===
- Order of Cyril and Methodius, I degree (Bulgaria) (1968)
- Commander of the Order of Arts and Letters (France) (1992)
- Parasat Order (1995, Kazakhstan)
- Medal "For Finland", Order of the Lion of Finland (1958)

== In popular culture ==
Ulanova is portrayed by Aliya Tanikpaeva (billed as "Aliya Tanykpayeva") in a non-speaking role in episode 1 of season 2 of the Netflix series The Crown.

She was earlier played by Cyd Charisse in the Hollywood film Mission to Moscow (1943).

== See also ==
- List of dancers
- List of Russian ballet dancers
