= List of Russian ballet dancers =

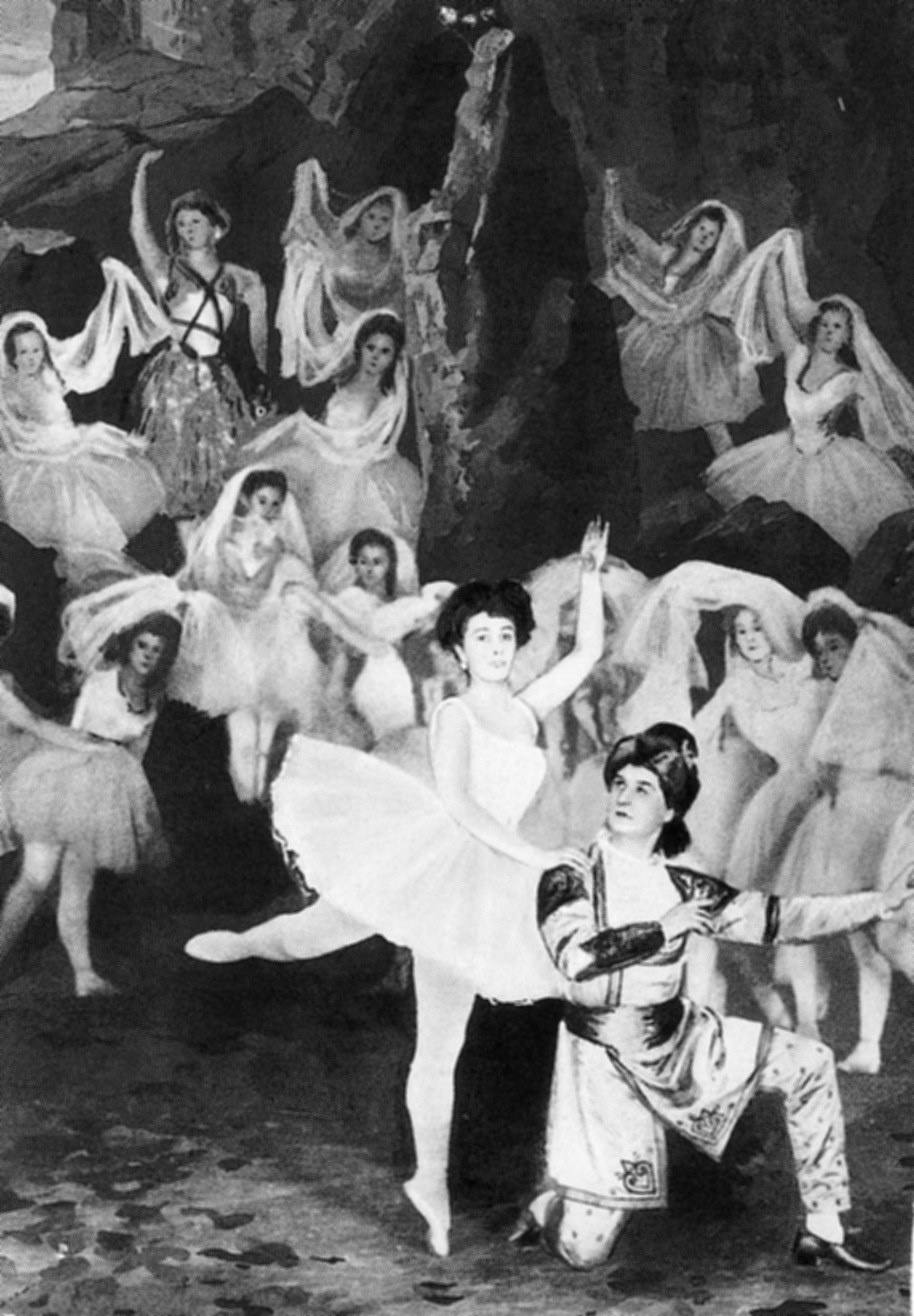
Mathilde Kschessinskaya and Pavel Gerdt in La Bayadère ballet by the ballet master Marius Petipa and the composer Ludwig Minkus, 1900

This is a list of ballet dancers from the Russian Empire, Soviet Union, and Russian Federation, including both ethnic Russians and people of other ethnicities. This list includes as well those who were born in these three states but later emigrated, and those who were born elsewhere but immigrated to the country and performed there for a significant portion of their careers.

The original purpose of the ballet in Russia was to entertain the royal court. The first ballet company was the Imperial School of Ballet in St. Petersburg in the 1740s. The Ballets Russes was a ballet company founded in the 1909 by Sergey Diaghilev, an enormously important figure in the Russian ballet scene. Diaghilev and his Ballets Russes' travels abroad profoundly influenced the development of dance worldwide. The headquarters of his ballet company was located in Paris, France. A protégé of Diaghilev, George Balanchine, founded the New York City Ballet Company.

During the early 20th century, many Russian ballet dancers rose to fame. Soviet ballet preserved the perfected 19th century traditions, and the Soviet Union's choreography schools produced one internationally famous star after another. The Bolshoi Ballet in Moscow and the Mariinsky in Saint Petersburg remain famous throughout the world.

== Alphabetical list ==
=== A ===
| Portrait | Person | Details | Stage Image |
|---|---|---|---|
| | Anastasia Abramova (1902–1985); Russian Empire; Soviet Union ballerina, Bolshoi Theatre | | |
| | Svetlana Adyrkhaeva (born 1938); Soviet Union; Russian Federation; Prima ballerina, Bolshoi Theatre | | |
| | Boris Akimov (born 1946); Soviet Union; Russian Federation; Danseur, Bolshoi Theatre | | |
| | Maria Alexandrova (born 1978); Soviet Union; Russian Federation; Prima ballerina, Bolshoi Theatre | | Maria Alexandrova as Kitri in Don Quixote, Bolshoi Theatre, 22 June 2011 |
| | Maria Allash (born 1976); Soviet Union; Russian Federation; Ballerina, Bolshoi Theatre | | |
| | Elena Andreianova (1819–1857); Russian Empire; Prima ballerina, Bolshoi Theatre, Mariinsky Ballet | | |
| | Yelena Andrienko (born 1972); Soviet Union; Russian Federation ballerina, Bolshoi Theatre | | |
| | Valery Viktorovich Anisimov (born 1953); Soviet Union; Russian Federation; Danseur, Bolshoi Theatre, Teacher | | |
| | Anna Antonicheva (born 1973); Soviet Union; Russian Federation ballerina, Bolshoi Theatre | | |
| | Altynai Asylmuratova (born 1961); Soviet Union; Russian Federation Kazakhstan; Prima ballerina, Mariinsky Theatre | | |
| | Zhanna Ayupova (born 1966); Soviet Union; Russian Federation; Ballerina, Mariinsky Theatre | | |

=== B ===
| Portrait | Person | Details | Stage Image |
|---|---|---|---|
| | Feya Balabina (1910–1982); Russian Empire; Soviet Union; Ballerina, Teacher, Ballet master, Mariinsky Theatre, Mikhaylovsky Theatre, Vaganova Academy of Russian Ballet | | |
| | George Balanchine (1904–1983); Russian Empire; Soviet Union; France; United States (Georgian descent); Choreographer, balletmaster | Balanchine was one of the 20th century's foremost choreographers, a balletmaster of the Ballets Russes in France, founding balletmaster (and co-founder) of New York City Ballet: his work created modern ballet, based on his deep knowledge of classical forms and techniques. | Balanchine and Suzanne Farrell in Don Quixote |
| | Irina Baronova (1919–2008); Soviet Union; Romania; France; United States; Switzerland; Russian Federation; Australia; Ballerina, ballet mistress | She was one of the Baby Ballerinas of the Ballet Russe de Monte Carlo, discovered by George Balanchine in Paris in the 1930s. She created roles in Léonide Massine's Le Beau Danube (1924), Jeux d'enfants (1932), and Les Présages (1933); and in Bronislava Nijinska's Les Cent Baisers (1935). Between 1940 and 1951 Baronova appeared in several films, and worked as ballet mistress for the 1980 film Nijinsky. | A photo with Baronova's autograph |
| | Mikhail Baryshnikov (born 1948); Soviet Union; United States; Danseur | | Mikhail Baryshnikov with Patricia McBride in Le baiser de la fée |
| | Dmitry Belogolovtsev (born 1973); Soviet Union; Russian Federation; Danseur, Bolshoi Theatre | | Dmitri Belogolovtsev as Abderahman, "Raymonda", Bolshoi Theatre, 2010 |
| | Natalia Bessmertnova (1941–2008); Soviet Union; Russian Federation; Prima ballerina, Bolshoi Theatre | | A scene from ballet "Giselle". Natalia Bessmertnova as Giselle. |
| | Alexander Bogatyrev (1949–1998); Soviet Union; Russian Federation; Danseur, Bolshoi Theatre | | |
| | Zhanna Bogoroditskaya (born 1969); Soviet Union; Russian Federation; Ballerina, Stanislavski and Nemirovich-Danchenko Moscow Academic Music Theatre | | |
| | Violetta Bovt (1927–1995); United States; Soviet Union; Ballerina, Stanislavski and Nemirovich-Danchenko Moscow Academic Music Theatre | | Violetta Bovt and Arkady Nikolaev. 1965 |
| | Nikolai Boyarchikov (born 1935); Soviet Union; Russian Federation; Danseur, Ballet master, Mikhaylovsky Theatre | | |
| | Boris Bregvadze (1926–2012); Soviet Union; Russian Federation; Danseur, Teacher, Mariinsky Theatre | | |
| | Dmitri Bryantsev (1947–2004); Soviet Union; Russian Federation; Danseur, Ballet master, Stanislavski and Nemirovich-Danchenko Moscow Academic Music Theatre | | |
| | Yuri Burlaka (born 1968); Soviet Union; Russian Federation; Danseur, Ballet master, Teacher, Moscow State Academy of Choreography, Bolshoi Theatre | | |
| | Vladimir Bourmeister (1904–1971); Russian Empire; Soviet Union; Danseur, Ballet master, Stanislavski and Nemirovich-Danchenko Moscow Academic Music Theatre | | |

=== C ===
| Portrait | Person | Details | Stage Image |
|---|---|---|---|
| | Raissa Calza (1894–1979); Russian Empire; Ukraine | | |
| | Vakhtang Chabukiani (1910–1992); Soviet Union; Danseur, Choreographer, Ballet master, Mariinsky Theatre, Tbilisi Opera and Ballet Theatre | | |
| | Catherine Chislova (1846–1889); Russian Empire; Ballerina | | Catherine Chislova c. 1865 |

=== D ===
| Portrait | Person | Details | Stage Image |
|---|---|---|---|
| | Alexandra Danilova (1903–1997); Russian Empire; Soviet Union; France; United States; Prima ballerina | | Danilova as Fanny Cerrito in Pas de Quatre, 1948 |
| | Pavel Dmitrichenko (born 1984); Russia; Former principal dancer, Bolshoi Ballet | | |
| | Natalia Dudinskaya (1912–2003); Russian Empire; Soviet Union; Russian Federation; Prima ballerina, Mariinsky Theatre | | |

=== E ===
| Portrait | Person | Details | Stage Image |
|---|---|---|---|
| | Lubov Egorova (1880–1972); Russian Empire; France; Ballerina, Mariinsky Theatre | | Lubov Egorova in the title role of the choreographer Marius Petipa's and the composer Cesare Pugni's ballet The Blue Dahlia, 1905 |
| | Olga Esina (born 1986); Soviet Union; Russian Federation; Ballerina | Olga Esina (in Russian Ольга Есина) is a Russian ballerina who was educated at the Vaganova Academy of Russian Ballet in St. Petersburg. In 2010 she became First Solo Dancer at the Vienna State Ballet. | Olga Esina and Roman Lazik, "Donauwalzer" Belvedere, Vienna, 1 January 2012 |

=== F ===
| Portrait | Person | Details | Stage Image |
|---|---|---|---|
| | Nikolai Fadeyechev (born 1933); Soviet Union; Russian Federation; Dancer, Teacher, Bolshoi Theater | Nikolai Fadeyechev was born in Moscow, was a Soviet Russian dancer ballet, was dancer with the Bolshoi Ballet, graduated from the Moscow Ballet School in 1952 and joined the Bolshoi Theatre, danced many principal roles. He danced alongside some of the great ballerinas such as Galina Ulanova in "Giselle" and "Les Sylphides", was a regular partner with Maya Plisetskaya, Raisa Struchkova, Nina Timofeeva, Marina Kondratyeva, Natalia Bessmertnova, Ekaterina Maximova, Ludmila Semenyaka. After that, he became one of the most important teachers and répétiteurs of the Bolshoi Theatre. Nikolay Tsiskaridze, Andrey Uvarov, Sergei Filin, Artem Ovcharenko were among her adepts. | Nikolai Fadeyechev in a scene from Pyotr Tchaikovsky's ballet Swan Lake staged at the State Academic Bolshoi Theater of the USSR. 1 January 1956 |
| | Sergei Filin (born 1970); Soviet Union; Russian Federation; Dancer, Artistic Director, Bolshoi Theater | | |
| | Mikhail Fokine (1880–1942); Russian Empire; United States; Danseur | | Mikhail Fokine as the hussar in Halte de Cavelerie, Saint Petersburg, c. 1900 |

=== G ===
| Portrait | Person | Details | Stage Image |
|---|---|---|---|
| | Valentina Ganibalova (born 1948); Soviet Union; Russian Federation; Ballerina, Mariinsky Theatre | | |
| | Yekaterina Geltzer (1876–1962); Russian Empire; Soviet Union; Prima ballerina, Bolshoi Theatre | | |
| | Elizaveta Gerdt (1891–1975); Russian Empire; Soviet Union; Ballerina | | Elizaveta Gerdt, Elsa Vill, and Pierre Vladimirov in the "Paquita" Pas de Trois, 1905 |
| | Pavel Gerdt (1844–1917); Russian Empire; Premier Danseur Noble | | Pavel Gerdt as Pepito in The King's Command or The Pupils of Dupré |
| | Adelaide Giuri (1872–1963); Italy; Russian Empire; Soviet Union; Ballerina, Bolshoi Theatre, La Scala | | Adelaide Giuri as Odette and Mikhail Mordkin as Prince Siegfried in Alexander Gorsky's staging of the Petipa/Ivanov "Swan Lake" for the Bolshoi Theatre, Moscow, 1901. A young Vera Karalli is seen kneeling. |
| | Alexander Godunov (1949–1995); Soviet Union; United States; Danseur | | |
| | Kasyan Goleizovsky (1892–1970); Russian Empire; Soviet Union; Danseur, Choreographer, Ballet master, Bolshoi Theatre | | |
| | Sofia Golovkina (1915–2004); Russian Empire; Soviet Union; Russian Federation; Ballerina, Teacher, Ballet master, Moscow State Academy of Choreography, Bolshoi Theatre | | |
| | Alexander Gorsky (1871–1924); Russian Empire; Soviet Union; Danseur, ballet master, Mariinsky Theatre, Bolshoi Theatre | | Ballets by Alexander Gorsky In Philately "Gudule’s Daughter" (a revision of the "La Esmeralda") (1902), "Salammbô" (1910), "Don Quixote" (1900), "Giselle" (1907), "La Bayadère" (1917) |
| | Nadezhda Gracheva (born 1969); Soviet Union; Russian Federation; Ballerina, Bolshoi Theatre | | A scene from "Raymonda". Nadezhda Gracheva as Raymonda, Bolshoi Theatre, 2010 |
| | Yury Grigorovich (1927–2025); Soviet Union; Russian Federation; Danseur, Choreographer, Ballet master, Mariinsky Theatre, Bolshoi Theatre | Yury Nikolayevich Grigorovich is a Soviet and Russian dancer and choreographer who dominated the Russian ballet for 30 years. Grigorovich was born into a family connected with the Imperial Russian Ballet. He graduated from the Leningrad Choreographic School in 1946 and danced as a soloist of the Kirov Ballet until 1962. His staging of Sergey Prokofiev's The Stone Flower (1957) and of The Legend of Love (1961) brought him acclaim as a choreographer. In 1964 he moved to the Bolshoi Theatre, where he would work as an Artistic director until 1995. His most famous productions at the Bolshoi were "The Legend of Love" (1965, 2002), The Nutcracker (1966), Spartacus (1967), Ivan the Terrible (ballet) (1975), The Golden Age (1982, 1994, 2006). Other notable productions The Sleeping Beauty (1963, 1973, 2011), Swan Lake (1969, 2001), Romeo and Juliet (1979, 2010), Raymonda (1984, 2003), Giselle (1987), La Bayadère (1991), Don Quixote (1994), Le Corsaire (1994). Choreographed for various Russian companies before settling in Krasnodar, where he set up his own company. Grigorovich has been heading the juries of numerous international competitions in classical ballet. After the death of his wife, the great ballerina Natalia Bessmertnova, on 19 February 2008, he has been offered the opportunity to return to the Bolshoi again in the capacity of ballet master and choreographer. | |
| | Dmitry Gudanov (born 1975); Soviet Union; Russian Federation; Danseur, Bolshoi Theatre | | Dmitry Gudanov as Albrecht in "Giselle", Bolshoi Theatre, 21 January 2011 |

=== I ===
| Portrait | Person | Details | Stage Image |
|---|---|---|---|
| | Avdotia Istomina (1799–1848); Russian Empire; Prima ballerina | | |
| | Lev Ivanov (1834–1901); Russian Empire; Danseur, choreographer, ballet master, Mariinsky Theatre | | Lev Ivanov costumed as Solor for Act I of "La Bayadère". St. Petersburg, 1877. |

=== K ===
| Portrait | Person | Details | Stage Image |
|---|---|---|---|
| | Viktorina Kapitonova (born 1985); Russian Federation; Switzerland; Prima ballerina | | |
| | Vera Karalli (1889–1972); Russian Empire; Weimar Republic; Nazi Germany; Austria; Soviet Union; Ballerina, actress | | Russian ballerina Vera Karalli, 1910s |
| | Tatiana Karpakova (1812–1842); Russian Empire; Ballerina, Bolshoi Theater | | |
| | Tamara Karsavina (1885–1978); Russian Empire; United Kingdom; Prima ballerina | | Russian ballerina Tamara Karsavina (c. 1912) |
| | Nora Kiss (1908–1993); Russian Empire ballerina, ballet teacher in Paris | | |
| | Irina Kolpakova (born 1933); Soviet Union; Russian Federation; Prima ballerina, Mariinsky Theatre | | |
| | Evgenia Kolosova (1780–1869); Russian Empire; Ballerina | | |
| | Marina Kondratyeva (1934–2024); Soviet Union; Russian Federation ballerina, Bolshoi Theater | | Marina Kondratyeva as Giselle and Maris Liepa as Albrecht in a scene from Act 1 of Adolphe Charles Adam's ballet Giselle staged at the State Academic Bolshoi Theater of the USSR. 1 January 1972 |
| | Theodore Kosloff (1882–1956); Russian Empire; United States; Danseur | | Theodore Kosloff in Fokine's 1913 production of Scheherazade |
| | Ekaterina Krysanova (born 1985); Soviet Union; Russian Federation; Ballerina, Bolshoi Theatre | | |
| | Mathilde Kschessinska (1872–1971); Russian Empire; France; Prima ballerina assoluta | | Russian ballerina Mathilde Kschessinskaya in "The Talisman", 1905. Mariinsky Theatre, St. Petersburg, Russia |
| | Ninel Kurgapkina (1929–2009); Soviet Union; Russian Federation; Ballerina, Teacher, Mariinsky Theatre | | |

=== L ===
| Portrait | Person | Details | Stage Image |
|---|---|---|---|
| | Leonid Lavrovsky (1905–1967); Russian Empire; Soviet Union; Danseur, Choreographer, Ballet master, Mariinsky Theatre, Mikhaylovsky Theatre, Bolshoi Theatre | | |
| | Mikhail Lavronsky (born 1941); Soviet Union; Russian Federation; Danseur, Bolshoi Theatre | | |
| | Larissa Lezhnina (born 1969); Russian Federation; Netherlands; Ballerina, Mariinsky Theatre, Dutch National Ballet | | |
| | Olga Lepeshinskaya (1916–2008); Russian Empire; Soviet Union; Russian Federation; Prima ballerina, Bolshoi Theatre | | Olga Lepeshinskaya as Kitry in Don Quixote. 1940 |
| | Andris Liepa (born 1962); Soviet Union; Russian Federation; Latvia; Danseur, Bolshoi Theatre, Mariinsky Theatre, Theatre director, Theatrical producer | | |
| | Ilze Liepa (born 1963); Soviet Union; Russian Federation; Ballerina, Bolshoi Theatre | | |
| | Māris Liepa (1936–1989); Latvia; Soviet Union; Danseur, Latvian Opera and Ballet Theatre, Bolshoi Theatre | | Marina Kondratyeva as Giselle and Maris Liepa as Albrecht in a scene from Act 1 of Adolphe Charles Adam's ballet Giselle staged at the State Academic Bolshoi Theater of the USSR. 1 January 1972 |
| | Serge Lifar (1905–1986); Russian Empire; France; Danseur, ballet master | | Tamara Toumanova and Serge Lifar in Swan Lake |
| | Ulyana Lopatkina (born 1973); Soviet Union; Russian Federation; Prima ballerina, Mariinsky Theatre | | Ulyana Lopatkina of the Mariinsky Ballet in Swan Lake at the Royal Opera House. 7 August 2009 |
| | Lydia Lopokova (1892–1981); Russian Empire; United Kingdom; Ballerina | | Ballerina Lydia Lopokova |
| | Fyodor Lopukhov (1886–1973); Russian Empire; Soviet Union; Danseur, Teacher, Choreographer, Ballet master, Mariinsky Theatre, Mikhaylovsky Theatre | | |
| | Elena Lukom (1891–1968); Russian Empire; Soviet Union; Ballerina, Mariinsky Theatre | | Elena Lukom and Vladimir Ponomarev as ballet "Les Caprices du Papillon". St. Petersburg, Russia. 1919 |
| | Svetlana Lunkina (born 1979); Soviet Union; Russian Federation; Prima ballerina, Bolshoi Theatre | | Svetlana Lunkina as Odette in Swan Lake, Bolshoi Theatre, 22 May 2011 |

=== M ===
| Portrait | Person | Details | Stage Image |
|---|---|---|---|
| | Askold Makarov (1925–2000); Soviet Union; Russian Federation; Danseur, Choreographer, Teacher, Mariinsky Theatre, Theatre Choreographic Miniatures | | |
| Natalia Makarova 2012 | Natalia Makarova (born 1940); Soviet Union; United States prima ballerina assoluta Choreographer, Teacher, Kirov Ballet | Defected to the West in 1970. Initially active with the Royal Ballet then settled in US and active globally | |
| | Yulia Makhalina (born 1968); Soviet Union; Russian Federation; Prima ballerina, Mariinsky Theatre | | |
| | Léonide Massine (1896–1979); Russian Empire; Danseur, choreographer | | |
| | Valery Maximov (born 1971) Soviet Union Russian Federation Danseur, choreographer, Actor | | |
| | Ekaterina Maximova (1939–2009); Soviet Union; Russian Federation; Prima ballerina, Bolshoi Theatre | Ekaterina Sergeevna Maximova was a Soviet and Russian ballerina of international renown. Maximova was coached by the legendary ballerina Galina Ulanova. Her greatest successes were the roles of Kitri in Don Quixote, Clara (called Maria in the Bolshoi production) in The Nutcracker, and the title roles in Giselle and Cinderella. Maximova performed with the Bolshoi Ballet from 1958 until 1980, often performing opposite her husband Vladimir Vasiliev. She and her husband gained wide exposure for their appearances in Franco Zeffirelli's filmed version of Giuseppe Verdi's opera La traviata (1983). When the Bolshoi Ballet toured to the United States for the first time in 1959, Maximova also performed as a guest artist with the Metropolitan Opera in leading roles in The Stone Flower and other ballets. Following her career as a dancer, Maximova was a coach with the ballet and a member of the GITIS Institute faculty. After that, she became one of the most important teachers and répétiteurs of the Bolshoi Theatre. Galina Stepanenko, Svetlana Lunkina, Marianna Ryzhkina, Anna Nikulina were among her adepts. | Yekaterina Maksimova (R) as Kitri and Vladimir Vasilyev as Basilio in a scene from Ludwig Minkus' ballet Don Quixote staged at the State Academic Bolshoi Theater of the USSR. 1 January 1971 |
| | Asaf Messerer (1903–1992); Russian Empire; Soviet Union; Danseur, choreographer | | |
| | Sulamith Messerer (1908–2004); Russian Empire; Soviet Union; United Kingdom; Japan; Ballerina,choreographer | | |
| | Galina Mezentseva (born 1952); Soviet Union; Russian Federation; United States; Ballerina, Mariinsky Theatre | | |
| | Igor Moiseyev (1906–2007); Soviet Union; Russian Federation; Ballet master, Igor Moiseyev Ballet | | |
| | Irek Mukhamedov OBE (born 1960); Tatarstan; Soviet Union; United Kingdom; Senior Principal Dancer, Bolshoi Ballet, The Royal Ballet | Awarded the Hans Christian Andersen Award for best dancer in the world in 1988. Defected to the West in 1990. Settled in the United Kingdom where he performed in leading roles before taking up choreography. | |
| | Vladimir Muravlev (born 1974); Uzbekistan; Russia; Principal Dancer, Moscow Classical Ballet | | |

=== N ===
| Portrait | Person | Details | Stage Image |
|---|---|---|---|
| | Anastasia Nabokina (1971–); Russian; Soviet Union; Russia | | |
| | Bronislava Nijinska (1891–1972); Polish; Russian Empire; United States; Prima Ballerina, choreographer | | |
| | Vaslav Nijinsky (1890–1950); Polish; Russian Empire; Danseur, choreographer | | Nijinsky in Le Spectre de la Rose |
| | Irma Nioradze (born 1969); Soviet Union; Georgia; Russian Federation; Ballerina, Mariinsky Theatre | | |
| | Cleo Nordi (1898–1983); Kronstadt; Russian Empire; Ballerina with Anna Pavlova, choreographer ballet teacher Sadler's Wells Ballet, London | | |
| | Rudolf Nureyev (1938–1993); Soviet Union; France; Austria; Danseur, choreographer, Mariinsky Theatre, Paris Opera | | |

=== O ===
| Portrait | Person | Details | Stage Image |
|---|---|---|---|
| | Evgenia Obraztsova (born 1984); Soviet Union; Russian Federation; Prima Ballerina, Mariinsky Theatre, Bolshoi Theatre | | Evgenia Obraztsova dancing "The Sleeping Beauty", Royal Opera House, London, November 2009 |
| | Natalia Osipova (born 1986); Soviet Union; Russian Federation; Ballerina, Bolshoi Theatre, Mikhaylovsky Theatre | | Natalia Osipova in an extract from "Flames of Paris", at the October 2011 reopening gala of the Bolshoi Theatre |
| | Artem Ovcharenko (born 1986); Soviet Union; Russian Federation; Dancer, Bolshoi Theatre | | Artem Ovcharenko as Jean de Brienne, "Raymonda", Bolshoi Theatre, 2010 |

=== P ===
| Portrait | Person | Details | Stage Image |
|---|---|---|---|
| | Valery Panov (born 1938); Soviet Union; Israel; Danseur, choreographer, Mariinsky Theatre | | |
| | Daria Pavlenko (born 1978); Soviet Union; Russian Federation; Prima ballerina, Mariinsky Theatre | | |
| | Anna Pavlova (1881–1931); Russian Empire; The Netherlands; Prima ballerina | | Anna Pavlova in the Fokine/Saint-Saëns The Dying Swan, Saint Petersburg, 1905 |
| | Nadezhda Pavlova (born 1956); Soviet Union; Russian Federation; Prima ballerina, Bolshoi Theatre | | |
| | Marie Petipa (1857–1930); Russian Empire; France; Ballerina | | |
| | Marius Petipa (1818–1910); France; Russian Empire; Danseur, choreographer, ballet master, Mariinsky Theatre | | Ballets by Marius Petipa In Philately "Paquita" (1847), "The Sleeping Beauty" (1890), "Swan Lake" (1895), "Raymonda" (1898) |
| | Maya Plisetskaya (1925–2015); Soviet Union; Russian Federation; Lithuania; Spain; Prima ballerina assoluta, Bolshoi Theatre | | Maya Plisetskaya performing in Carmen (Carmen Suite). 1974 |
| | Olga Preobrajenska (1871–1962); Russian Empire; France; Ballerina, Mariinsky Theatre | | Olga Preobrajenska in the title role of the choreographer Louis Méranté's and the composer Léo Delibes's ballet "Sylvia", Mariinski-Ballett, 1901 |

=== R ===
| Portrait | Person | Details | Stage Image |
|---|---|---|---|
| | Tatiana Riabouchinska (1917–2000); Russian Empire; France; United States; Ballerina | | |
| | Ida Rubinstein (1883–1960); Russian Empire; France; Ballerina, actress | | |
| | Farukh Ruzimatov (1963–); Tashkent, Uzbekistan>br />Uzbek-Russian; Danseur, Assistant Artistic Director | | |
| | Marianna Ryzhkina (????–); Russia; Ballerina | | |

=== S ===
| Portrait | Person | Details | Stage Image |
|---|---|---|---|
| | Galina Samsova (1937–2021); Russia; Ballerina | | |
| | Olga Sapphire (1907–1981); Russian Empire; Japan; Danseur, Teacher, Nihon Gekijō (Tokyo) | Olga Ivanovna Pavlova trained at both the Leningrad State Choreographic Institute and Moscow Choreographic School and performed throughout Russia until her marriage in the early 1930s to a Japanese diplomat. Moving to Japan in 1936, she was influential in establishing ballet in Japan. | Sapphire performing in Giselle, Tokyo, 1936 |
| | Gennady Selutsky (born 1936); Soviet Union; Russian Federation; Danseur, Teacher, Mariinsky Theatre, Vaganova Academy of Russian Ballet | | |
| | Ludmila Semenyaka (born 1952); Soviet Union; Russian Federation; Ballerina, Bolshoi Theatre | | Lyudmila Semenyaka (left) and Nikolai Kovmir (right) performing at the 1st international ballet contest in Moscow. 1 June 1969 |
| | Nina Semizorova (born 1956); Soviet Union; Russian Federation; Ballerina, Bolshoi Theatre | | |
| | Marina Semyonova (1908–2010); Russian Empire; Soviet Union; Russian Federation; Prima ballerina assoluta, Teacher, Mariinsky Theatre, Bolshoi Theatre | Marina Timofeyevna Semyonova was the first Soviet-trained prima ballerina. She was born in Saint-Petersburg. She was named a People's Artist of the USSR in 1975. She worked in the Kirov Ballet until 1930, transferred to the Bolshoi Theatre in Moscow. Semyonova was guest with the Paris Opéra Ballet in 1935 where she danced Giselle with Serge Lifar. She received the Stalin Prize for 1941 and retired in 1952. After that, she became one of the most important teachers and répétiteurs of the Bolshoi Theatre. Natalia Bessmertnova, Marina Kondratyeva, Nadezhda Pavlova, Nina Sorokina, Ludmila Semenyaka, Nina Timofeeva, Nina Ananiashvili, Galina Stepanenko and Nikolay Tsiskaridze were among her adepts. In 2003, she won the Prix Benois de la Danse for lifetime achievement. Semyonova retired from her coaching duties at the age of 96, died on 9 June 2010 in her home in Moscow, three days before her 102nd birthday. | |
| | Konstantin Sergeyev (1910–1992); Russian Empire; Soviet Union; Russian Federation; Danseur, Choreographer, Mariinsky Theatre | | |
| | Alla Shelest (1919–1998); Soviet Union; Russian Federation; Prima ballerina, Mariinsky Theatre | | |
| | Maria Shirinkina (born 1987); Soviet Union; Russian Federation; Prima Ballerina, Mariinsky Theatre, Bayerisches Staatsballett | | |
| | Vladimir Shklyarov (1985-2024); Soviet Union; Russian Federation; Premier Danseur, Mariinsky Theatre, Bayerisches Staatsballett | | |
| | Daniil Simkin; Russian Federation; Premier Danseur, American Ballet Theatre | | |
| | Maria Skorsiuk (1872–1901); Ballerina, Mariinsky Ballet | | |
| | Yuri Soloviev (1940–1977); Soviet Union; Premier Danseur, Mariinsky Theatre | | |
| | Alina Somova (born 1985); Soviet Union; Russian Federation; Ballerina, Mariinsky Theatre | | Alina Somova in a scene from Pyotr Tchaikovsky's ballet Sleeping Beauty |
| | Nina Sorokina (1942–2011); Elektrostal, Soviet Union; Russian; Ballerina, Ballet Bolshoi | | |
| | Olga Spessivtseva (1895–1991); Russian Empire; Soviet Union; France; United States; Prima ballerina, Mariinsky Theatre | | Russian Prima ballerina Olga Spessivtseva as Odette in Swan Lake, 1934 |
| | Galina Stepanenko (born 1966); Soviet Union; Russian Federation; Ballerina, Bolshoi Theatre | | Galina Stepanenko as Aegina from ballet Spartacus, Bolshoi Theatre |
| | Raisa Struchkova (1925–2005); Soviet Union; Russian Federation; Ballerina, Bolshoi Theatre | | Raisa Struchkova as Aurora in a scene from Pyotr Tchaikovsky's ballet Sleeping Beauty staged at the State Academic Bolshoi Theater of the USSR. 1 March 1954 |
| | Mariia Surovshchikova-Petipa (1836–1882); Russian Empire; Prima ballerina | | |

=== T ===
| Portrait | Person | Details | Stage Image |
|---|---|---|---|
| | Tamara Tchinarova (1919–2017); Bessarabia; France; Australia; United Kingdom (Armenian, Georgian and Ukrainian descent) ballerina, Ballet Russe de Monte-Carlo, choreographer | Trained in Paris by Preobrajenska, Tchinarova was closely associated with Balanchine's Baby Ballerinas and a member of Wassily de Basil's Original Ballet Russe, and Les Ballets 1933. In Australia she created roles for the Kirsova Ballet and for Edouard Borovansky. She worked on films with husband, Peter Finch. Settled in the UK from 1948 she was an English/Russian interpreter for ballet companies and author of dancer biographies and history. | Tamara Tchinarova in Les Présages, Sydney, between 6 December 1936 and January 1939 - photo Max Dupain |
| | Vadim Tedeev (1946–2011); Soviet Union; Russian Federation; Dancer, Stanislavski and Nemirovich-Danchenko Moscow Academic Music Theatre | | |
| | Ekaterina Telesheva (1804–1857); Russian Empire; Ballerina, Bolshoi Kamenny Theatre | | |
| | Viktoria Tereshkina (born 1983); Soviet Union; Russian Federation; Prima ballerina, Mariinsky Theatre | | |
| | Vasily Tikhomirov (1876–1956); Russian Empire; Soviet Union dancer, Ballet master, Teacher, Bolshoi Theatre | | |
| | Nina Timofeeva (born 1935); Soviet Union; Russian Federation; Israel; Ballerina, Mariinsky Theatre, Bolshoi Theatre | | |
| | Liudmila Titova (born 1987); Russian Federation; Prima ballerina, Director, Royal Moscow Ballet | Liudmila Titova (Russian: Людмила Титова) was born 9 October 1987 in Moscow, Russia, and has been called "one of the most celebrated ballet dancer and ballet teacher in the world." Born in Moscow, Russia, Liudmila Titova started dancing at the age of seven years based on recommendation from her doctor to help with a problem with her back. She joined the school's dance club and found herself dancing every day. At the age of 10, she took a three-day examination and physical and was only seven out of 105 applicants admitted into the Bolshoi Academy of Ballet, also known as the Moscow State Academy of Choreography, where her area of study became, "Theatre of Classical Ballet" by Smirnov-Golovanov. For the next eight years, Titova trained eight hours per day, six days per week. After graduating the world-renown, prestigious Bolshoi Academy of Ballet, Liudmila Titova went to work for the Royal Moscow Ballet Company. The Royal Moscow Ballet Company is located in Moscow, Russia, so Liudmila Titova was able to stay in her native Moscow. At the early age just 19, Liudmila was given leading a role in one of the world's most coveted plays, "Cinderella". This unimaginable feat is unheard of in the Ballet realm, where leading roles are generally earned by ballet dancers after many years or performances, usually after the age of 25. Liudmila was such a success, she went on to be the lead in other famous plays, such as "The Nutcracker," "Don Quixote," "Giselle," "Bolero," "Carmen," "Romeo and Juliet," "Sleeping Beauty," "Swan Lake," and "The Time." In 2014, at the age of 26, Liudmila Titova was promoted to the position of the General Director of the Royal Moscow Ballet. | |
| | Nikolay Tsiskaridze (born 1973); Soviet Union; Georgia; Russian Federation dancer, Bolshoi Theatre | Nikolay Tsiskaridze, also spelled Ziskaridze, one of the most decorated Russian dancers, was a premier dancer of the Bolshoi Ballet for 21 years. Ethnically Georgian, he was born in Tbilisi on 31 December 1973. He joined the Moscow Ballet School in 1987 and was admitted into the Bolshoi Ballet in 1991. In 1992 Tsiskaridze joined the ballet company of the Bolshoi Theater. The then artistic director Yuri Grigorovich saw Nikolai at the graduation exam. At the theater he had the good fortune to enter the class of prominent ballerina Marina Semyonova, and as Nikolai says, became his second mother. The legendary Galina Ulanova also assisted him. Over the course of his dance career he performed more than 70 roles in major classical works. One of the best ballet princes, he is equally convincing in modern choreographies. Roland Petit, who staged "La Dame de Pique" in 2001, created the role of Hermann especially for Tsiskaridze. In 1996, he graduated from the Teacher Training Department of the Moscow Ballet Academy and since 2003 had been teaching a daily ballet class at the Bolshoi Theatre combining his dance career with coaching. Besides, since 2004 he had been also teaching at the Moscow Ballet Academy. He became the youngest person to be named a People's Artist of Russia (2001). He received the State Prize of the Russian Federation in 2001 and 2003 and the Prix Benois de la Danse in 1999. During his career he received many honours - Silver medal at the Osaka Ballet Competition (1995), Golden medal at the Moscow Ballet Competition (1997), Honoured Artist of Russia (1997), Russian Golden Mask theatrical prize (1998, 2000, 2003), Benois de la Danse (1999), Order of Honour of the Republic of Georgia (2003), Danza&Danza award as best dancer of the year 2003, Triumph prize (2004), Chevalier de l'Ordre des Arts et des Lettres de la République Française (2006), People's Artist of North Osetia —Alania Republic (2013). In 2014, Tsiskaridze graduated as a Master of Law at Kutafin Moscow State Law University. On 29 Nov 2014 Tsiskaridze was elected as Rector of Vaganova Academy of Russian Ballet in Saint Petersburg, est. in 1738. | Tsiskaridze in 2017 |
| | Tamara Toumanova (1919–1996); Russian SFSR; France; United States (Georgian descent); Prima ballerina, choreographer | Trained in Paris by Preobrajenska, Toumanova was one of Balanchine's Baby Ballerinas and a close colleague of Léonide Massine. She made her debut in the children's ballet L'Éventail de Jeanne. Nicknamed The Black Pearl of the Russian Ballet, she performed in Balanchine's Le Bourgeois Gentilhomme and Le Palais de Cristal. She appeared in Hollywood films, including The Private Life of Sherlock Holmes, Tonight We Sing (playing Anna Pavlova), Deep in My Heart, Days of Glory, and Alfred Hitchcock's Torn Curtain. | Tamara Toumanova in 1932 |
| | Slava Tutukin (born 1989); Soviet Union; Russian Federation; Former ballet dancer, arts manager | Tutukin graduated from the Vaganova Academy in 2008 and began his professional career as a soloist with the Mikhailovsky Theatre. He subsequently performed in Germany before moving into international arts management. | |

=== U ===
| Portrait | Person | Details | Stage Image |
|---|---|---|---|
| | Galina Ulanova (1910–1998); Russian Empire; Soviet Union; Russian Federation; Prima ballerina assoluta, Mariinsky Theatre, Bolshoi Theatre | Trained under Agrippina Vaganova and her own mother, a ballerina of the Imperial Russian Ballet, Ulanova joined the Mariinsky Theatre in 1928. After 1944 she became a prima ballerina assoluta in Bolshoi Theatre. In 1945 she danced the title role in the world premiere of Prokofiev's Cinderella. On her first international tour in 1956 she achieved enormous success. Having retired from the stage in 1960, Ulanova coached many generations of the Russian dancers. After that, she became one of the most important teachers and répétiteurs of the Bolshoi Theatre. Ekaterina Maximova, Vladimir Vasiliev, Svetlana Adyrkhaeva, Nina Timofeeva, Ludmila Semenyaka, Nina Semizorova, Alla Mikhalchenko, Nadezhda Gracheva and Nikolay Tsiskaridze were among her adepts. | Galina Ulanova, as Juliet (right), and Yury Zhdanov as Romeo in Sergei Prokofiev's ballet "Romeo And Juliet". 1 October 1954 |
| | Andrey Uvarov (born 1971); Soviet Union; Russian Federation; Dancer, Bolshoi Theatre | | Svetlana Zakharova and Andrey Uvarov in Swan Lake, Bolshoi Theatre, 28.10.2011 |

=== V ===
| Portrait | Person | Details | Stage Image |
|---|---|---|---|
| | Agrippina Vaganova (1879–1951); Russian Empire; Soviet Union; Ballerina, Teacher, ballet master | Agrippina Yakovlevna Vaganova was a Russian ballet teacher who developed the Vaganova method – the technique which derived from the teaching methods of the old Imperial Ballet School (today the Vaganova Academy of Russian Ballet) under the Premier Maître de Ballet Marius Petipa throughout the mid to late 19th century, though mostly throughout the 1880s and 1890s. It was Vaganova who perfected and cultivated this form of teaching the art of classical ballet into a workable syllabus. Her Fundamentals of the Classical Dance (1934) remains a standard textbook for the instruction of ballet technique. Her technique is one of the most popular techniques today. Among Vaganova's dance alumnae were the distinguished Soviet ballerinas Marina Semenova, Olga Jordan, Galina Ulanova, Tatiana Vecheslova, Feya Balabina, Natalia Dudinskaya, Alla Shelest, Nonna Yastrebova, Olga Moiseeva, Ludmilla Safronova, Ninel Kurgapkina, Alla Osipenko and Irina Kolpakova. Shortly after her death, on 1 November 1957, the Choreographic College on Rossi street was renamed in her honor; in 1961, it received the title of "academic" and in 1991 it began to use the name Agrippina Vaganova Academy of Russian Ballet. | Agrippina Vaganova in "La Esmeralda". St. Petersburg, circa 1910. |
| | Ivan Vasiliev (born 1989); Russian Federation; Danseur | | Ivan Vasiliev in an extract from Spartacus, at the October 2011 re-opening gala of the Bolshoi Theatre |
| | Vladimir Vasiliev (born 1940); Soviet Union; Russian Federation; Danseur, Bolshoi Theatre | Vladimir Viktorovich Vasiliev a Russian ballet dancer, was premier dancer with the Bolshoi Ballet, and was best known for his role of Spartacus and his powerful leaps and turns, graduated from the Moscow Ballet School in 1958 (his teachers included Aleksey Yermolayev) and joined the Bolshoi Ballet. He became a premier dancer who made enormous contributions to the development of classical male dance; he came to embody the strong new Bolshoi male. He was the first dancer to be given the award la médaille d’or du meilleur danseur du Monde ("The Gold Medal of the World’s Best Dancer"); subsequently Mikhail Baryshnikov and Patrick Dupond were also awarded the distinction. Russia's influential ballet critic and choreographer Fyodor Lopukhov called him "God of the dance … A miracle in art, perfection". Numerous roles were created for him, and he performed throughout the world, usually partnering his wife, Bolshoi prima ballerina Ekaterina Maximova. Among the most notable were those created by Yuri Grigorovich, who gave him the principal roles in his original productions of Spartacus, The Nutcracker, Ivan the Terrible. Nonetheless, he and Maximova gleaned wide exposure for their appearances in Franco Zeffirelli's filmed version of Giuseppe Verdi's opera La traviata (1983). Both performed in Spanish costume (Vasiliev as a matador) in the divertissements composed for the equivalent of Act II, scene 2. Besides Maximova, Vasiliev's famous partners included: Galina Ulanova, Maya Plisetskaya, Alicia Alonso, Carla Fracci, Rita Poelvoorde and Ambra Vallo. | Vladimir Vasilyev as Nutcracker Prince in scene from Pyotr Tchaikovsky's ballet The Nutcracker staged at the State Academic Bolshoi Theater of the USSR. 1 March 1966 |
| | Ekaterina Vazem (1848–1937); Russian Empire; Soviet Union; Prima ballerina, Teacher, Bolshoi Kamenny Theatre, Mariinsky Theatre | | Ekaterina Vazem costumed as Nikiya for Act II of "La Bayadère". St. Petersburg, 1877. |
| | Tatiana Vecheslova (1910–1991); Russian Empire; Soviet Union; Prima ballerina, Mariinsky Theatre | | |
| | Oleg Vinogradov (born 1937); Soviet Union; Russian Federation; Danseur, Ballet master, Choreographer, Teacher, | Mikhaylovsky Theatre, Mariinsky Theatre | |
| | Diana Vishneva (born 1976); Soviet Union; Russian Federation; Prima ballerina, Mariinsky Theatre | Vishneva is one of the 21st century's leading dancers; she is a prima ballerina at the Mariinsky Ballet since 1995 and performs as a guest in ABT since 2005, as well as on other world scenes. Her repertoire includes Don Quixote, Romeo and Juliet, La Bayadère, Sleeping Beauty, Swan Lake, and Giselle. She also performs in George Balanchine's Jewels and Kenneth MacMillan's Manon. | |
| Paquita pas de trois | Pierre Vladimiroff (1893–1970); Russian Empire; France; United States; Danseur | | Performing Paquita with Elza Vill and Elizaveta Gerdt, 1905 |
| | Anastasia Volochkova (born 1976); Russia; Ballerina | | |
| Stella Voskovetskaya | Stella Voskovetskaya (born 1965); Soviet Union; United States; Ballet dancer, Choreographer, Mariinsky Theatre | Stella Voskovetskaya, Vaganova Academy of Russian Ballet graduate, Founder and Artistic Director of Illinois Classical Ballet. created a unique and very effective system of training where she blended elements of training from Vaganova ballet school, where the training program for children is truly unique and was tested for centuries and unusually effective system barre au sol developed by Boris Knyazev That program significantly speed up and improve the training of young ballet dancers, helped with correcting posture, turnout in all three positions, flexibility and balance | |

=== Y ===
| Portrait | Person | Details | Stage Image |
|---|---|---|---|
| | Leonid Yakobson (1904–1975); Russian Empire; Soviet Union; Danseur, Choreographer, Ballet master, Mariinsky Theatre | | |
| | Aleksey Yermolayev (1910–1975); Russian Empire; Soviet Union; Danseur, Choreographer, Teacher, Mariinsky Theatre, Bolshoi Theatre | | Marina Semyonova as the Princess and Aleksey Yermolayev as the Nutcracker in The Nutcracker staged at the State Academic Bolshoi Theatre, 1939. |

=== Z ===
| Portrait | Person | Details | Stage Image |
|---|---|---|---|
| | Rostislav Zakharov (1907–1984); Russian Empire; Soviet Union; Danseur, Teacher, Choreographer, Ballet master, Theatre director, Mariinsky Theatre, Bolshoi Theatre | | |
| | Svetlana Zakharova (born 1979); Soviet Union; Russia; Prima ballerina, Bolshoi Theatre | | Svetlana Zakharova and Andrei Merkuriev in 2006 |

== See also ==
- Category:Russian ballet dancers
- Ballets Russes
- Bolshoi Theater
- Mariinsky Theater
- New York City Ballet
- Kyiv Ballet
- Russian ballet
- Russian composers
- Russian culture
- Ukrainian Dancers, 1890s and early 1900s painting series by Edgar Degas
- Russian opera singers
- Sergei Diaghilev
- List of African-American ballerinas
- List of dancers
- Prima ballerina assoluta
- List of prima ballerinas
- List of the main ballet masters of the Saint Petersburg State Ballet
