= Nikolai Fadeyechev =

Russian ballet dancer (1933–2020)

- Николай Фадеечев
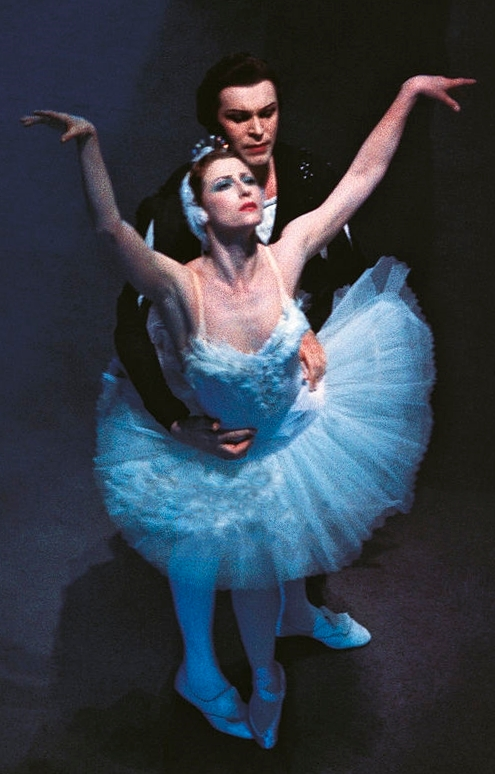
- Fadeyechev with Maya Plisetskaya in Swan Lake, Milan, 1964
- Born: January 27, 1933; Moscow, Russian SFSR, Soviet Union
- Died: June 23, 2020 (aged 87); Moscow, Russia
- Occupations: Ballet dancer, teacher
- Employer: Bolshoi Theatre
- Awards: People's Artist of the USSR

Nikolai Borisovich Fadeyechev (Note: Russian: Николай Борисович Фадеечев, romanized: Nikolay Borisovich Fadeyechev) (27 January 1933 – 23 June 2020) was a Soviet and Russian ballet dancer, teacher, and répétiteur of the Bolshoi Ballet. He was awarded People's Artist of the USSR in 1976.

== Biography ==
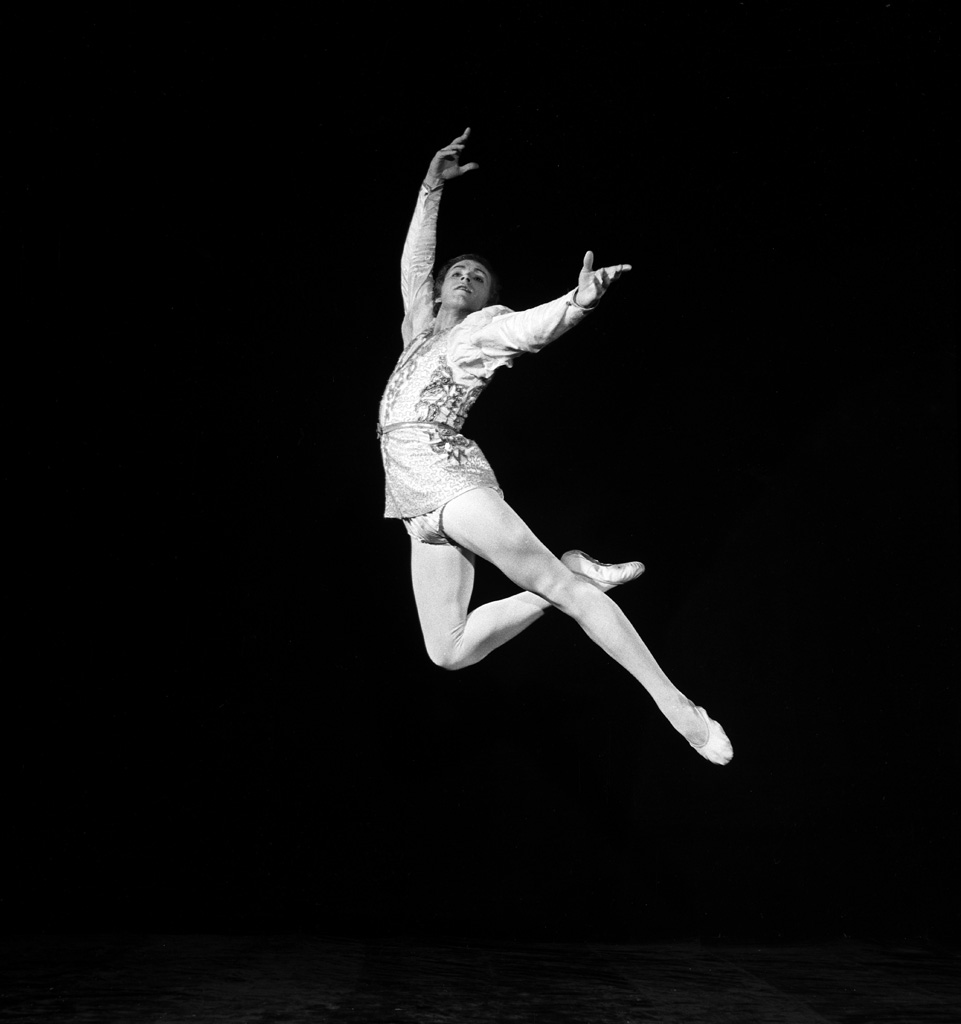
Fadeyechev in Swan Lake in Moscow, 1956

Fadeyechev was born on 27 January 1933 in Moscow. In 1952, he graduated from the Moscow Ballet School, where he had studied with Alexander Rudenko, and joined the Bolshoi Theatre, where he performed many principal roles. He made his international debut in London in 1956 with the ballet Giselle, dancing alongside Galina Ulanova. He was a regular partner with Maya Plisetskaya, Raisa Struchkova, Nina Timofeeva, Marina Kondratyeva, Natalia Bessmertnova, Ekaterina Maximova and Ludmila Semenyaka. After retiring from the stage in 1977, he became one of the most important teachers and répétiteurs of the Bolshoi Theatre. His students have included Nikolay Tsiskaridze, Andrey Uvarov, Sergei Filin, Ruslan Skvortsov and Artem Ovcharenko.

=== Personal life and Death ===
He was married to Irina Kholina, a ballerina, and had two sons: Aleksei Fadeyechev, a choreographer for the Bolshoi, and Aleksandr. On June 23, 2020, Fadeyechev died of heart failure in Moscow, at 87 years of age.

== Repertoire ==
- Swan Lake: Prince Siegfried
- The Sleeping Beauty: Prince Désiré, Bluebird
- Nutcracker Suite: Prince, Mouse King
- Giselle: Albrecht
- Raimonda: Jean de Brienne, Bernard, grand pas
- Les Sylphides (called Chopiniana in the Bolshoi production): Soloist
- Romeo and Juliet: Romeo
- The Fountain of Bakhchisarai: Vatslav
- Laurencia: Frondoso, Youth
- Gayane: Armen
- The Stone Flower: Danila (first interpreter at the Bolshoi Theater), Opal
- The Firebird (L’oiseau de feu): Prince Ivan (first interpreter at the Bolshoi Theater)
- Spartacus: Harmodius (first interpreter)
- Carmen Suite: José (first interpreter)
- Anna Karenina: Karenin (first interpreter)
- Asel: Ilyas (first interpreter)
- Prelude: Soloist (first interpreter)
- Class Concert: Soloist

== See also ==
- List of Russian ballet dancers
