= Marina Kondratyeva =

Russian ballet dancer (1934–2024)

- Марина Кондратьева
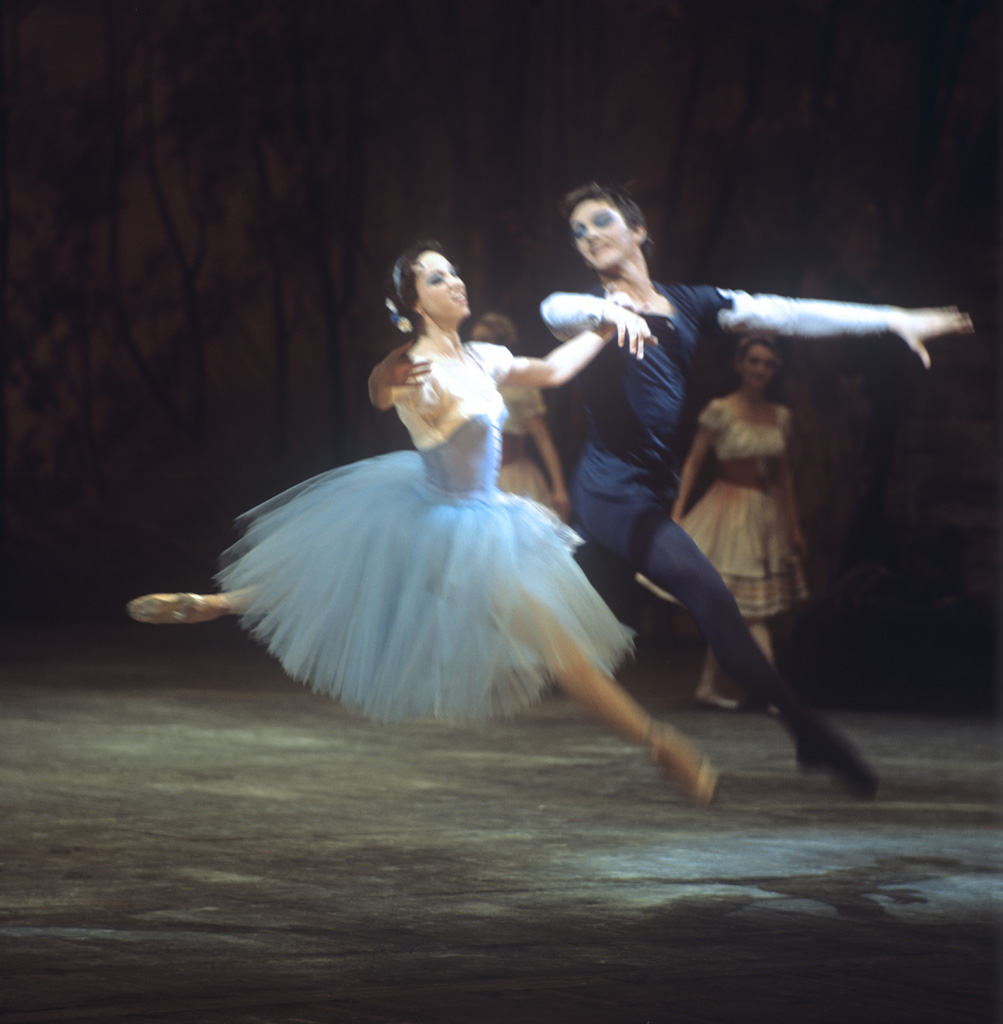
- Kondratyeva with Māris Liepa in a scene from Giselle in 1972
- Born: Marina Viktorovna Kondratyeva; 1 February 1934; Leningrad, Russian SFSR, USSR
- Died: 8 July 2024 (aged 90); Moscow, Russia
- Education: Moscow Choreographic School
- Occupations: Ballet dancer; academic teacher; choreographer
- Awards: People's Artist of the USSR
- Dancing career
- Former groups: Bolshoi Ballet

Marina Viktorovna Kondratyeva (Note: Sometimes rendered as Kondratieva.) (Russian: Марина Викторовна Кондратьева, pronounced [mɐˈrʲinə ˈvʲiktərəvnə kɐnˈdratʲjɪvə]; 1 February 1934 – 8 July 2024) was a Russian ballerina at the Bolshoi Ballet. Described as "weightless, airy, poetic and spiritual", she is known for roles such as Juliet in Prokofiev's Romeo and Juliet and as Adam's Giselle, but also performed in contemporary ballets including world premieres. She toured with the Bolshoi troupe to London and the Metropolitan Opera in the 1960s. She became a master tutor at the Bolshoi, passing its tradition to younger dancers for decades.

== Biography ==
=== Early life ===
Kondratyeva was born on 1 February 1934 in Leningrad, the daughter of Viktor Kondratiev, an academic, doctor of physical and mathematical sciences, and winner of the Stalin Prize of the 1st class in 1946. She was recommended by Agrippina Vaganova to the Moscow Choreographic School, from which she graduated in 1952 from Galina Petrova's class.

She was then hired by the Bolshoi ballet troupe and trained by Marina Semionova exclusively. Her partners on stage were Māris Liepa, Nikolai Fadeyechev, Mikhail Lavrovsky, Boris Khokhlov, V. Tikhonov and Yaroslav Sekh, among others. She was described as "weightless, airy, poetic and spiritual", which served her well in roles such as Juliet in Prokofiev's Romeo and Juliet and as Giselle. As Giselle, she developed the performance traditions of Galina Ulanova into a richer concept of the character. Allen Hughes from The New York Times wrote in 1962 that she excelled in the role in a delightful performance by the Bolshoi Ballet on the stage of the Metropolitan Opera.

Kondratyeva danced not only traditional roles but contemporary works, including world premieres, choreographed by new talents. She appeared in a contrasting double role in Prokofiev's The Tale of the Stone Flower as "the sacrificial tender Katerina and the seductive treacherous Mistress of Copper Mountain". She realised an exuberant Bacchante in Walpurgis Night, but also a "passionate, rebellious and broken" Anna Karenina. Maya Plisetskaya wrote about her dancing the role under Plisetskaya's direction to music by her husband Rodion Shchedrin in 1972 that her Karenina "was just like Anna should be", further elaborating that "once again, her splendid qualities formed into a convincing and individual image" and that "she realised Tolstoy's heroine in her own way without following my vision". She performed as Cinderella and as Princess Aurora in Tchaikaovsky's The Sleeping Beauty, among others. In 1956 she was part of the Bolshoi troupe touring in London during the Cold War, recalled 60 years later in another tour there.

=== Later life ===
Kondratyeva studied choreography further and graduated in 1980 from the Lunarchasky State Institute of Dramatic Art (GITIS) in Moscow. She began her teaching career at the Moscow Classical Ballet (now the Kassatkina and Vassiliov Ballet Theater). From 1980 to 1987, she taught at GITIS as a docent starting in 1986. In addition to her work at the Bolshoi Ballet, Kondratyeva gave lessons at the Moscow Dance Institute and taught classical ballet at the Moscow State Academy of Choreography between 1990 and 2000. She was appointed professor at the latter in 1999.

She rehearsed with such ballerinas as Margarita Perkoun-Bebezitchi of the Classical Ballet Theater and with artists from the Bolshoi studio of Yury Grigorovich. She became a ballet mistress and director in 1988. She staged Paquita's grand pas at the Bolshoi based on Marius Petipa's choreography and Perrot's Pas de Quatre from Anton Dolin's choreography.

She directed the women's classes at the Bolshoi and was a master tutor, saying in a 2006 interview that the goal was not an imitation of a teacher but to fill a role with individual character. She prepared and followed the careers of great soloists such as Ludmila Semenyaka, whom she prepared for Les Sylphides, Galina Anna Antonicheva, Ekaterina Shipulina, Galina Stepanenko, Olga Smirnova, Natalia Osipova, Nadezhda Gracheva, Nina Kaptsova, and later Ioulia Stepanova, A. Tourazachvili, N. Biryukova, Nelli Kobakhidze, Chinara Alizade, Anna Tikhomirova, Joo Yun Bae, and Anna Okuneva. Described as "soft-spoken, introverted, and gentle", she transferred the traditions of the Bolshoi to her students in great detail." Plisetskaya wrote of her teaching that her students were "distinguished by the perfect artistic taste and excellent school".

Kondratyeva served on the jury of the Benois de la Danse competition in 2003 and 2013. She was awarded the title People's Artist of the USSR. In 2013, Kondratyeva was appointed a member of the artistic council of the Bolshoi Ballet troupe, along with Stepanenko, Svetlana Adyrkhaeva, Nina Semizorova, and Alexander Vetrov. An exhibition at the theatre in 2022 celebrated the 70th anniversary of her joining the troupe, and she was also honoured by a gala performance of Giselle. Kondratyeva died in Moscow on 8 July 2024 at the age of 90 and was buried in Troyekurovskoye Cemetery.
