= Aleksey Yermolayev =

Russian ballet dancer

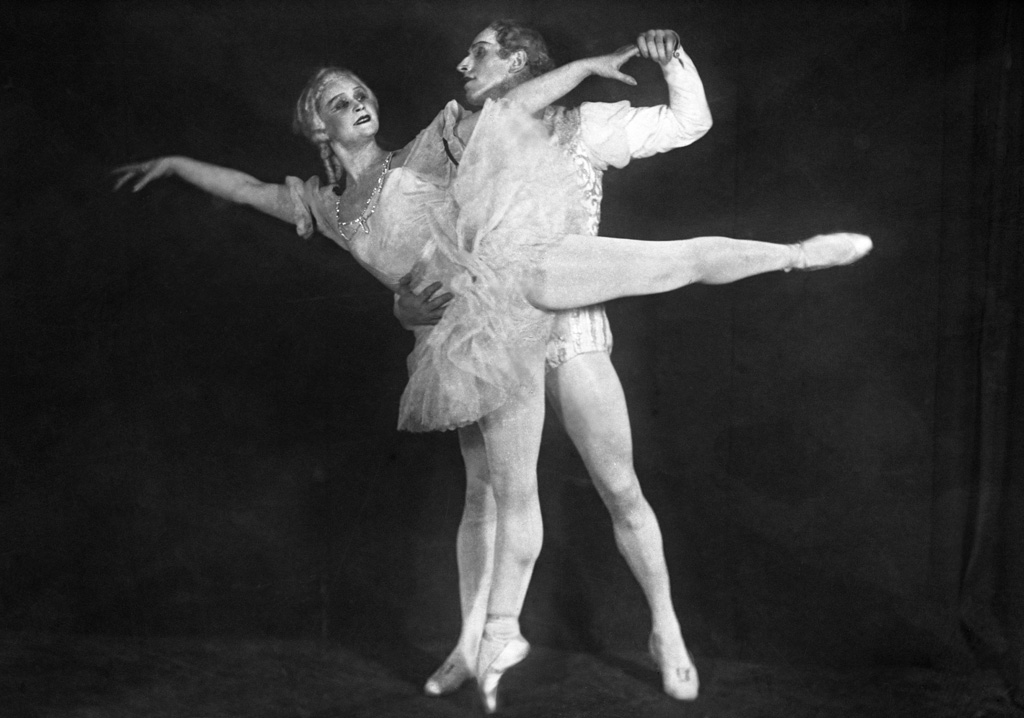
Marina Semyonova as the Princess and Aleksey Yermolayev as the Nutcracker in The Nutcracker, staged at the State Academic Bolshoi Theatre, 1939.

Aleksey Nikolayevich Yermolayev (Russian: Алексе́й Никола́евич Ермола́ев; 23 February [O.S. 10 February] 1910 – 12 December 1975) was a Soviet and Russian ballet dancer, choreographer and teacher. He played an important role in the development of Russian ballet between 1950 and 1975, and he was considered an outstanding actor. People's Artist of the USSR (1970).

== Education ==
Aleksey Yermolayev was born in Tver Governorate (Saint Petersburg according to different sources) in 1910. At the Leningrad Choreographic School he completed the required eight years of training in only five years, graduating in 1926, aged only 16; his teacher there was Vladimir Ponomaryov. He spent four years in the Mariinsky Theatre in Leningrad, and made his name in modern roles. He spent the years 1930–1938 as Principal Dancer at the Bolshoi Ballet in Moscow.

== Career ==
Yermolayev demonstrated impressive athletic strength, and a vivid personality in his acting. His roles included the God of the Wind (The Talisman), Basilio (Don Quixote), Albert (Giselle), Siegfried (Swan Lake), Abderakhman (Raymonda), Ripafratta (Mirandolina), and Gireï (La Fontaine de Bakhchissaraï).

He created roles in:

- Lopukhov's The Ice-Maiden (1927)
- Lopukhov, Ponomaryov, and Leontiev's The Red Poppy (1929)
- Jerome in Vainonen's Moscow version of the Flames of Paris (1933)
- Ripafrata in Vainonen's Mirandolina (1949)
- Tybalt in Lavrovsky's Moscow version of Romeo and Juliet (1946)
- Yevgeny in Zakharov's The Bronze Horseman (1949)
- Severyan in Leonid Lavrovsky's The Tale of the Stone Flower (1954).

In 1951 he created Piece Will Win War at the Belarusian National Bolshoi Opera and Ballet Theatre. He arranged the music and performed all the roles.

In the 1955 Soviet film of the Romeo and Juliet ballet, Yermolayev danced Tybalt, the role he created in 1946.

Among his choreographies were:

- Nightingale (the first Belarusian ballet; 1939, with Lopukhov; mus. M. Kroshner; for the Byelorussian Theatre of Opera and Ballet in Minsk), and
- Burning Hearts (or Fiery Hearts) (1955; mus. V. Zolotarev).

== Later life ==
He became a teacher and coach at the Bolshoi Ballet in 1960, remaining there until his death in 1975. From 1968 to 1972 he was also artistic director of the Moscow Choreographic School. Among his pupils were Alexander Godunov, Vladimir Vasiliev, Māris Liepa, U. Vladimirov and M. Lavrovsky.

He was a People's Artist of the USSR and Belarus, laureate of three Stalin Prizes in 1946, 1947 and 1950, and the Order of the Red Banner of Labour and the Order of the Badge of Honour.

He died in Moscow in 1975, aged 65.

== Awards ==
- Stalin Prize first degree (1947)
- Two Stalin Prizes second degree (1946, 1950)
- People's Artist of the USSR (1970)

== See also ==
- List of Russian ballet dancers
