= Yelena Andrienko =

Russian ballet dancer

- Елена Андреевна Андриенко
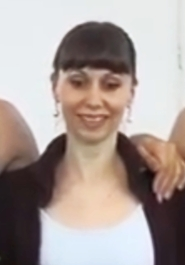
- Andrienko in 2013
- Born: 24 March 1972 (age 54); Kiev, Ukrainian SSR, Soviet Union
- Education: Moscow State Academy of Choreography
- Occupation: ballet dancer
- Years active: 1991–present
- Title: Merited Artist of the Russian Federation (2003)

Yelena Andrienko (Russian: Елена Андреевна Андриенко; born 24 March 1972) is a Russian soloist of Bolshoi Ballet, Honoured Artist of Russia.

External images
- Yelena Andrienko
- Andrienko as Kitri in Don Quixote, Serbia, National Theatre in Belgrade, 30.04.2011
- Andrienko and Tsiskaridze in The Nutcracker, Bolshoi Theatre, 07.01.2012

== Biography ==
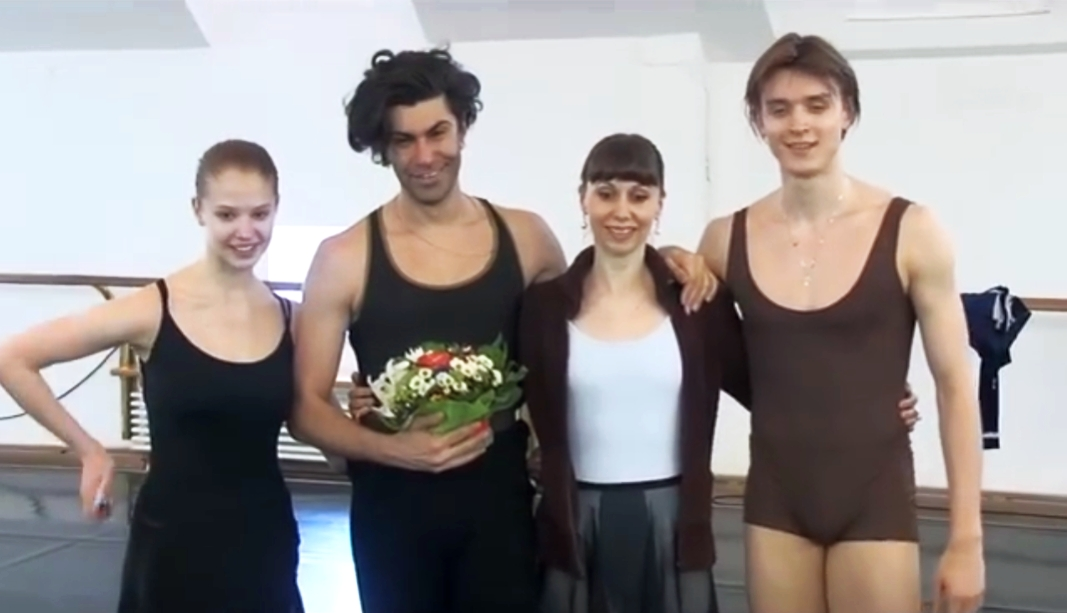
At the Bolshoi Theatre rehearsal with Angelina Vorontsova, Nikolai Tsiskaridze, and Denis Rodkin, 2013

Originally, Andrienko was born 24 March 1972 in a capital of Ukraine, Kiev where she attended Kiev Ballet School. After graduating from there, she was trained by Sofia Golovkina at the Moscow State Academy of Choreography. From 1993 to 1995, she appeared in many Yuri Grigorovich's plays such as the 1994's Giselle where she played the role of Myrtha, and The Golden Age where she appeared as Rita. In 1995, she played a role of Muse in a play called Paganini and the same year took a role of Snow White in a play of the same name. In 1996, she played Gamzatti in the La Bayadère and the same year participated in the Swan Lake of Vladimir Vasiliev as the Swan Princess.

Next year, she participated in a play called Sleeping Beauty where she played a role of Fairy of Carelessness and the same year played as Kitri in Don Quixote and in a comical play called The Taming of the Shrew where she played Katarina. In 1998, she played the role of Marie in The Nutcracker and the same year portrayed as Princess Florine in a reincarnation of Sleeping Beauty.

In 2000, she played the role of Magnolia in Cipollino and two years later appeared in the dual role of Odette-Odile in Swan Lake. In 2003, she participated in a play called The Limpid Stream where she played as a ballerina and the same year appeared as Clemence in Raymonda. In 2006, she played in Cinderella and next year participated as a soloist for In the Upper Room. The same year, she played in the Le Corsaire ballet and in 2009 appeared in La Sylphide and as a pupil in the Lesson following by the role of Beranger in a ballet called Esmeralda.

== See also ==
- List of Russian ballet dancers
