= Ryzhkin =

Ryzhkin (Russian: Рыжкин, from рыжий which refers to a color between red and yellow) is a Russian masculine surname, its feminine counterpart is Ryzhkina. It may refer to

- Marianna Ryzhkina (born 1971), Russian ballet dancer
- Viktor Ryzhkin (born 1937), Soviet ice dancer
- Vladimir Ryzhkin (1930–2011), Soviet football player
