= Larissa Lezhnina =

Russian ballet dancer (born 1969)

Larisa Lezhnina (Russian: Лариса Лежнина) is a principal dancer with Dutch National Ballet, Amsterdam. She was born on March 17, 1969, in Leningrad (now St. Petersburg), Russia. She graduated from the Vaganova Ballet Academy in Leningrad in 1987 and joined the Kirov Ballet (now the Mariinsky Ballet). In 1990 she became a First Soloist. She left the Mariinsky in 1994 and joined the Dutch National Ballet as a principal.

Larisa Lezhnina finished her dance career in June 2014. She has since remained involved at Dutch National Ballet as a ballet master.

== Main Repertoire ==
- The Nutcracker (with Kirov Ballet, 1994)
- The Sleeping Beauty (with Kirov Ballet, coached by Irina Kolpakova)
- Swan Lake (Dutch National Ballet, 2011)

== See also ==
- List of Russian ballet dancers
