= Ninel Kurgapkina =

Russian ballerina (1929–2009)

- Нинель Кургапкина
- Born: 13 February 1929; Leningrad, Russian SFSR, Soviet Union
- Died: 10 May 2009 (aged 80); Beloostrov, Russia
- Other names: Ninella Kurgapkina
- Occupations: Ballerina; Dance teacher

Ninel Aleksandrovna Kurgapkina (Note: Russian: Нинель Александровна Кургапкина, romanized: Ninel Aleksandrovna Kurgapkina) (13 February 1929 – 10 May 2009, known by the diminutive Ninella) (Note: Russian: Нинелла, romanized: Ninella) was a Soviet and Russian dance teacher and former prima ballerina for the Kirov Ballet with over 50 years stage experience. She was named a People's Artist of the USSR in 1974.

Kurgapkina was born in Leningrad. Ninel Kurgapkina was one of the last pupils of Agrippina Vaganova. She graduated her ballet school and joined the Kirov Ballet in 1947, where she danced such roles as Aurora (The Sleeping Beauty), Myrtha (Giselle), Odette-Odile (Swan Lake), Kitri (Don Quixote), Jeanne (Flames of Paris) and Parasha (The Bronze Horseman).

Despite their age difference, Ninel Kurgapkina was the first female ballet partner to Rudolf Nureyev, and later also to Mikhail Baryshnikov, both of whom were trained at the Kirov.

From 1969 she was a primary coach at the Kirov and also taught master classes at institutions including the New York City Ballet, the Paris Opera Ballet, and the La Scala Opera Ballet. She was appointed a director of the Vaganova Academy in 1972. She was an Associate Ballet Mistress at the Masterpiece Dance Theatre since 1994.

She died, aged 80, in a traffic collision in Beloostrov, on 10 May 2009.

== See also ==
- List of Russian ballet dancers
