= Anastasia Nabokina =

Russian ballerina (born 1971)

Anastasia Nabokina (Russian: Анастасия Павловна Набокина; born 14 February 1971) is a Russian ballerina, scholar of cultural studies, art critic, dance theorist, translator from the Russian language.

== Biography ==
Nabokina was born on 14 February 1971 in Moscow, Russia. In 1981 she entered the Moscow State Academy of Choreography. At the age of 17, she made her stage debut in a school production as Lise of La fille mal gardée in the Bolshoi Theatre, Moscow. After completing her studies in 1990, she was actively involved in the establishment of the Kremlin Ballet Theatre, as Principal dancer. She worked with Ekaterina Maximova, Vladimir Vasiliev and Nina Timofeeva.

In 1996, she moved to Warsaw, where she became the leading ballerina with the Teatr Wielki, Polish National Opera. At the Teatr Wielki, she appeared as Odette-Odile in Irek Mukhamedov's version of Swan Lake. She also worked with Natalia Makarova in her production of La Bayadère and Mats Ek in his Carmen and A sort of.... Nabokina frequently merges classical dancing techniques with dynamics of contemporary dance.

After her theatre career, she began her studies at the Jagiellonian University in Krakow. In 2022 she defended her doctoral thesis in cultural studies, on the basis of which she published the book The Desire to Dance. The Art of Movement in the Culture of the Russian Silver Age and its Psychoanalytic Contexts, Institute of Literary Research of the Polish Academy of Sciences, Warsaw 2023.

In 2014-2024 she cooperated with the Faculty of Polish Studies at the Jagiellonian University in Cracow, teaching the author's course Analysis of a Cultural Text: Dance. In 2021-2024 researcher and academic teacher at the Anthropology of Literature and Cultural Studies Department at the Faculty of Polish Studies, Jagiellonian University in Cracow. Awarded by Minister of Education and Science of Poland (2021), Minister of Culture of Poland (2003). Diploma of the 3rd International Rudolf Nureyev Ballet Competition (1998).

In 2011-2015 she cooperated as an art critic with the magazines 'Teatr', 'Obieg', 'Przekrój'.

== Personal life ==
Anastasia has a son, Jeremi Jaworski.
