= Vladimir Muravlev =

Russian ballet dancer

Vladimir Muravlev (Russian: Владимир Муравлёв) is a Russian ballet dancer, born 10 January 1974 in Tashkent (Uzbekistan). He is a grandson of Ural Tansykbayev. He has a degree in Performing Arts from the Uzbek Academic Ballet School (1993) under the tutelage balletmaster Kurkmas Sagatov; RATI - GITIS (2007). He is currently a Principal Dancer with the Moscow Classical Ballet.

Muravlev has partnered some of today's most renowned ballerinas, including Tamara Rojo, Galina Shlyapina, Lyudmila Vasilieva, Ekaterina Berezina, Olga Pavlova, Marina Rzhannikova.

== Debuts ==
1996 - Count Almaviva in Dmitry Bryantsev's Bravo!Figaro (based on Beaumarchais' Mariage de Figaro) at Stanislavsky and Nemirovich-Danchenko Moscow Academic Music Theatre (Moscow Stanislavsky Ballet)
1997 - Count Albrecht in Giselle at The State Academic Alisher Navoi Opera & Ballet Theatre (Tashkent, Uzbekistan, dedicated to the 50-year anniversary of the Uzbek Academic Ballet School
1998 - Prince in Derek Deane's The Nutcracker at the English National Ballet in London (United Kingdom)
1998 - Prince / Prince's Friend in Michael Corder's Cinderella at the English National Ballet in London (United Kingdom)
2002 - Prince Siegfried in Irek Mukhamedov's new production of Swan Lake at the Teatr Wielki – Polish National Opera (Warsaw, Poland)

== Roles ==
- Prince Désiré / The Bluebird - Sleeping Beauty (a.k.a. - La Belle au Bois dormant)
- Prince Siegfried / Benno / Venetian Dance (soloist) - Swan Lake,
- Prince / Tanzmeister - Cinderella
- Count Albrecht - Giselle
- Nutcracker Prince - The Nutcracker
- Basil / Gamache - Don Quixote
- Mercutio / Paris- Romeo and Juliet
- Colas - La Fille Mal Gardée
- Marcus Lucinius Crassus - Spartacus
- Pushkin, the Poet - Pushkin (a.k.a. - Pushkin – Reflections of the Poet)
- Rudi - Le Baiser de la fée (a.k.a. - The Fairy’s Kiss; The Ice Maiden)
- Mandarin - The Miraculous Mandarin
- Lead Role - Strauss-Gala (a.k.a. - The Tricks of Terpsichore)
- Narcissus

== Awards ==
- 1994 - International Ballet Competition «Arabesque» (Perm, Russia) / Bronze Medal
- 1997 - Moscow International Ballet Competition (Moscow, Russia) / Diploma
- 1997 - World Art Festival (Los Angeles, United States) /Champion of World Art Festival - Grand Prix and Gold Medal
- 2002 - International Festival of Dance & Music (Bangkok, Thailand) / Prize for Elegance by Swiss watch company "LONGINES"
- 2006 - Medal "Honour and advantage" of the International Welfare Foundation ART'S PATRONS OF CENTURY
- 2009 - Honoured Artist of Russia

== See also ==
- List of Russian ballet dancers
