= Nightingale (ballet) =

1939 ballet

Nightingale is a ballet created in 1939 by Aleksey Yermolayev and Fedor Lopukhov to music by Mikhail Kroshner. The libretto by Yermolayev and Yuri Slonimsky is based on a story by Źmitrok Biadula. Nightingale is the first Belarusian ballet to be staged at the National Opera and Ballet of Belarus, on 5 November 1939.
