= Avdotia Istomina =

Russian ballerina (1799–1848)

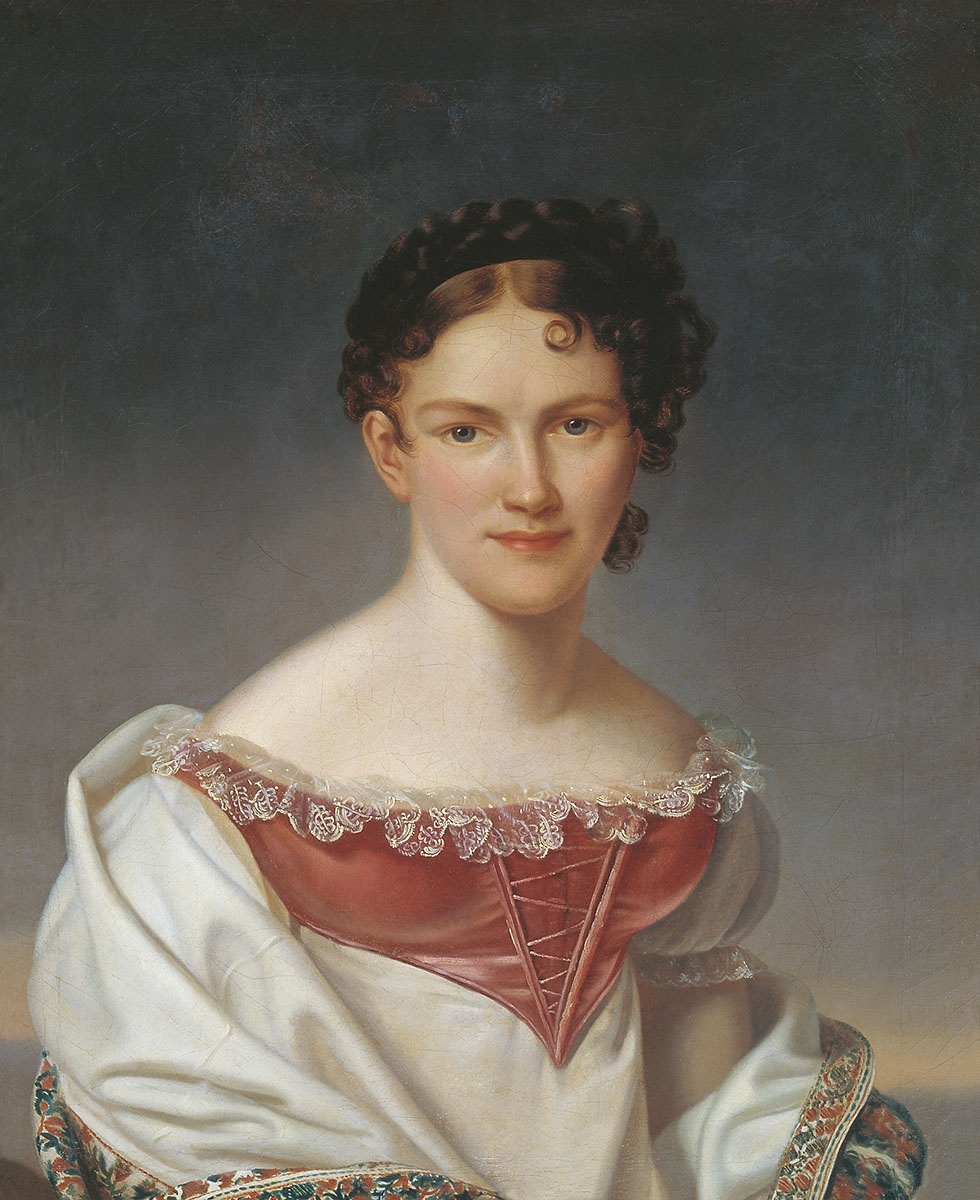
Portrait by Henri-François Riesener (1820s)

Evdokia or (informally) Avdotia Ilyinichna Istomina (Russian: Евдокия Ильинична Истомина; 1799–1848) was a Russian ballerina.

== Biography ==
She was orphaned at a young age, but was accepted into the Imperial Theater School, where children could live in complete security.

A pupil of Charles Didelot, she debuted in the Imperial Russian Ballet in 1815 to immediate acclaim. Several people were killed duelling for her heart, and her honour was defended in the fourfold duel (1817): Count Zavadovsky killed Count Sheremetev, while the Decembrist Yakubovich shot through a palm of the playwright Alexander Griboedov. Her dancing is the subject of a brilliant stanza in Eugene Onegin, which was described by Vladimir Nabokov as the most mellifluous lines in the whole of Russian poetry.

She danced nearly all of the principal roles in ballets by Didelot. She became the first Russian dancer en pointe. She served in the Imperial Ballet for twenty years. She married a young actor, but he soon died. Late in life she remarried, this time to the dramatic actor Pavel Ekunin. By this time she was no longer performing leading roles and her income was reduced by half. In the 1835/1836 season, she was injured during the performance and was asked to leave for treatment. Emperor Nicholas I of Russia saw this request and wrote the order: to be dismissed. On 30 January 1836, Avdotya Istomina came on stage one last time and danced a little Russian dance.

She died of cholera on 26 June in 1848 (8 July N.S.) in St. Petersburg. The inscription on her tomb: "Avdotya Ilyinichna Ekunina, a retired actress".

== See also ==
- List of Russian ballet dancers

== Sources ==
- "Истомина, Евдокия Ильинична" . Brockhaus and Efron Encyclopedic Dictionary (in Russian). 1906.
