= Olga Sapphire =

Russian and Japanese ballerina (1907–1981)

- Midori Shimizu
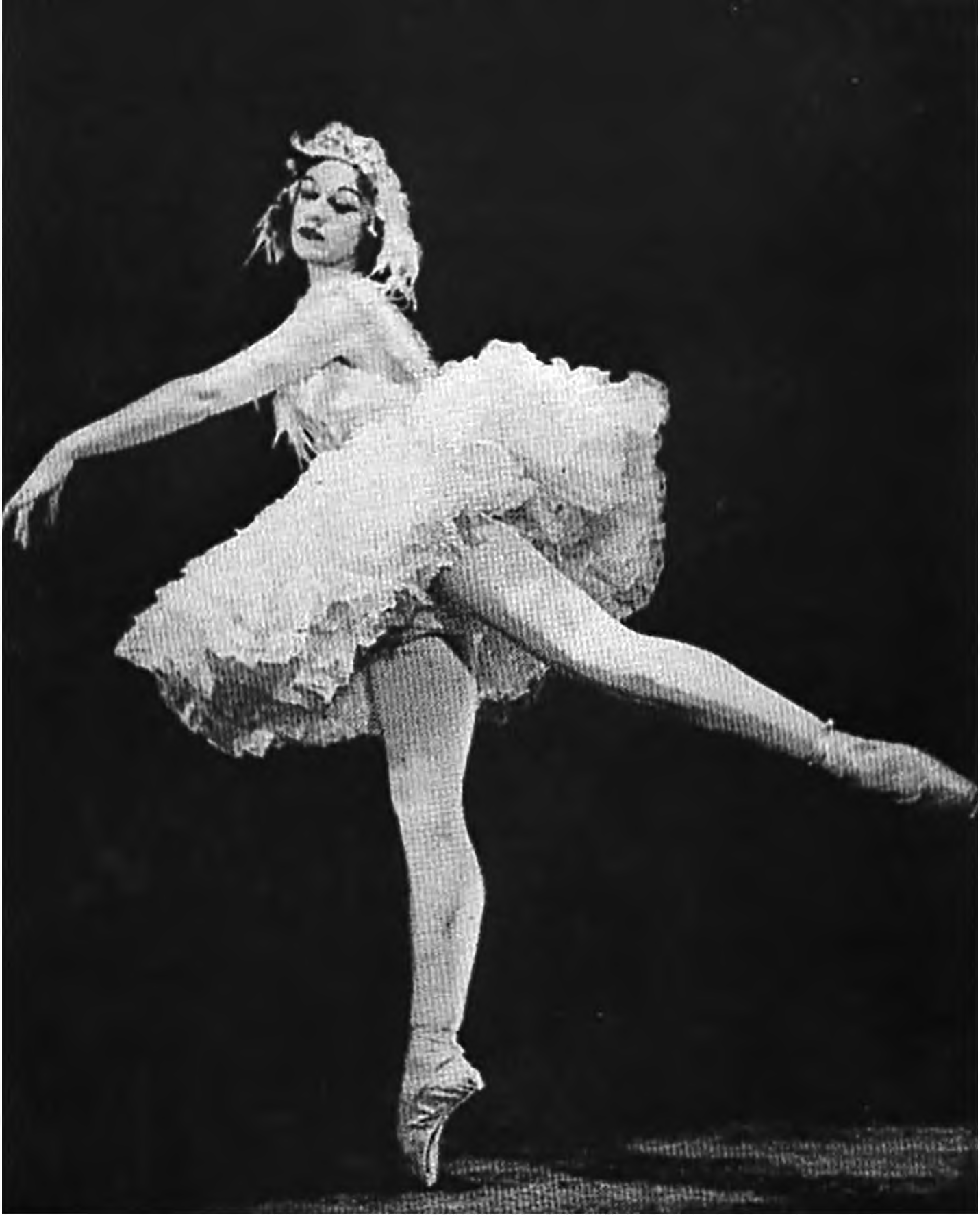
- Sapphire performing in The Dying Swan, 1937
- Born: Olga Ivanova Pavlova; 28 June 1907; Saint Petersburg, Russia
- Died: 20 June 1981 (aged 73); Tokyo, Japan
- Other names: Midori Aoyama, Origa Shimizu
- Citizenship: Russia, Japan
- Occupations: ballerina, choreographer, dance instructor
- Years active: 1928–1980
- Known for: Introducing the pedagogy of classical Russian dance to Japan

Olga Sapphire (Note: Russian: Ольга Сафайя or Russian: Ольга Сапфир; Japanese: オリガ・サファイア.) (28 June 1907 – 20 June 1981) was the stage name of Russian and Japanese ballerina and choreographer Olga Ivanovna Pavlova, (Note: Russian: Ольга Ивановна Павлова.) whose married name was Midori Shimizu. (Note: Japanese: 清水みどり.) She was classically trained at both the Leningrad State Choreographic Institute and the Moscow Choreographic School. She performed in Russia until her marriage in the early 1930s to a Japanese diplomat, Takehisa Shimizu. After agreeing to move to Japan in 1936, she developed classical ballet there, bringing with her theoretical and pedagogical materials to underpin her dance lessons and establish the field.

From 1936 until her retirement in 1957, Sapphire was employed by the Nihon Gekijō variety theater, in Tokyo, serving as its prima ballerina, choreographer and ballet instructor. She performed classic Russian ballets, managing all aspects of the productions, as well as choreographing Japanese dances for stage and film. She retired from the stage in 1953, but continued to be involved in ballet production until 1957. In her later years, Sapphire wrote three books about ballet, which remain influential in Japan.

== Early life and training ==
Pavlova was born on 28 June 1907 in Saint Petersburg, Russia, to Juliana Kuzminichna Kuzmina and Gustav Yanovich Grudberg. Her parents had a common-law marriage, as they were unable to wed since Grudberg was not a member of the Russian Orthodox Church. Her father was a locksmith, originally from Riga, and her mother was originally from Pskov near the Estonian border. When their first child, Ekaterina, was born, she was baptized with the surname Pavlova, a family name of her great-uncle. Olga was given the same surname. Pavlova was born during a period of turbulence, as the 1905 Russian Revolution had begun two years beforehand. World War I would follow when she was seven years old, and the 1917 Russian Revolution began when she was 10. Pavlova later wrote that her childhood was at a time of cold and hunger.

From an early age, Pavlova was highly interested in ballet, but given her family's circumstances, life as an artist was improbable. When World War I broke out, her mother began working in the store of the People's House, the center of the cultural scene in Saint Petersburg. Against her husband's wishes, Kuzmina encouraged her daughter and at age 12, Pavlova entered the free school located at #3 Gagarinskaya Street. It was run by Baron Yuri Nikolaevich Miklos, who had opened it in a philanthropic effort to develop dance. He hired noted instructors to teach classical ballet, as well as ballroom and character dancing. Students received four years of lectures before taking their final examinations. Pavlova studied under Apollinaria Gordova and was classmates with Igor Shvetsov. In 1922, when the authorities closed the Miklos school, she transferred to a school operated by Akim Volynsky and studied theory, taking evening dance courses at the Leningrad State Choreographic Institute. The Stalinist period was difficult as classical ballets were being replaced with ideological themes and ballet masters were relocating to the west. At her 1928 graduation, Pavlova performed as a soloist in fragments choreographed by Marius Petipa from La vestale by Gaspare Spontini.

== Career ==
=== In Russia (1928–1935) ===
Pavlova danced with Vakhtang Chabukiani and Sergey Gavrilovich Koren in scenes from the ballet The Masque of the Red Death (Russian: Маскарад Красной Смерти) by Nikolai Tcherepnin, on 10 November 1928. The following spring, she joined a dance troupe which traveled to Russian Turkestan, performing at Tashkent, before being invited to dance as a soloist in the theater operated by Alexey Feona. Along with other evening students from the Choreographic Institute, she performed at the Maly Opera House and was invited to participate in a touring company that traveled all over Russia between 1931 and 1932. During the tour, she danced the lead role of Taï-Choa in The Red Poppy to the music of Reinhold Glière. In September 1932, she returned to Leningrad where she lived with her husband, the choreographer of the Khabarovsk Regional Musical Comedy Theater, Leonid Romanovich Leonidov. Theirs was an artistic union, and that year he staged The Red Poppy. The marriage failed and Pavlova then married the Japanese diplomat, Takehisa Shimizu, taking the name Midori Shimizu. On 13 December 1934, Pavlova moved to Moscow, where she lived at 42 Herzen Street, the location of the Japanese Embassy.

In Moscow, Pavlova began studying with Viktor Semenov (Russian: Виктор Александрович Семёнов), head of the Moscow Choreographic School between 1931 and 1936. The repertoire they prepared for her included Waltz by Fritz Kreisler, The Dying Swan by Mikhail Fokine, the role of Nikiya from La Bayadère by Marius Petipa and Ludwig Minkus, the part of Anitra from Peer Gynt by Edvard Grieg and excerpts from Don Quixote to music by Minkus. Her mixed marriage caused difficulties and the fear of reprisal, as it was typical for people in this period to be accused of spying. (Note: In 1938, both her father, Gustav Yanovich Grudberg, and Baron Yuri Nikolaevich Miklos, who operated her first dance school, were executed by the Soviet authorities.) As Shimizu was a diplomat specializing in Russia, he may have had some warning that the Great Purge was coming. The couple began planning for a move to Japan and Pavlova gathered dance-related books, music, and costumes. She spoke with the Japanese ambassador, who set up a meeting in Moscow with the industrialist Ichizō Kobayashi. He had opened a film theater, which would be suitable to stage ballet, in Tokyo with capacity for audiences of up to 3,000 spectators. He asked her to go to Japan to establish ballet there.

=== In Japan (1936–1980) ===
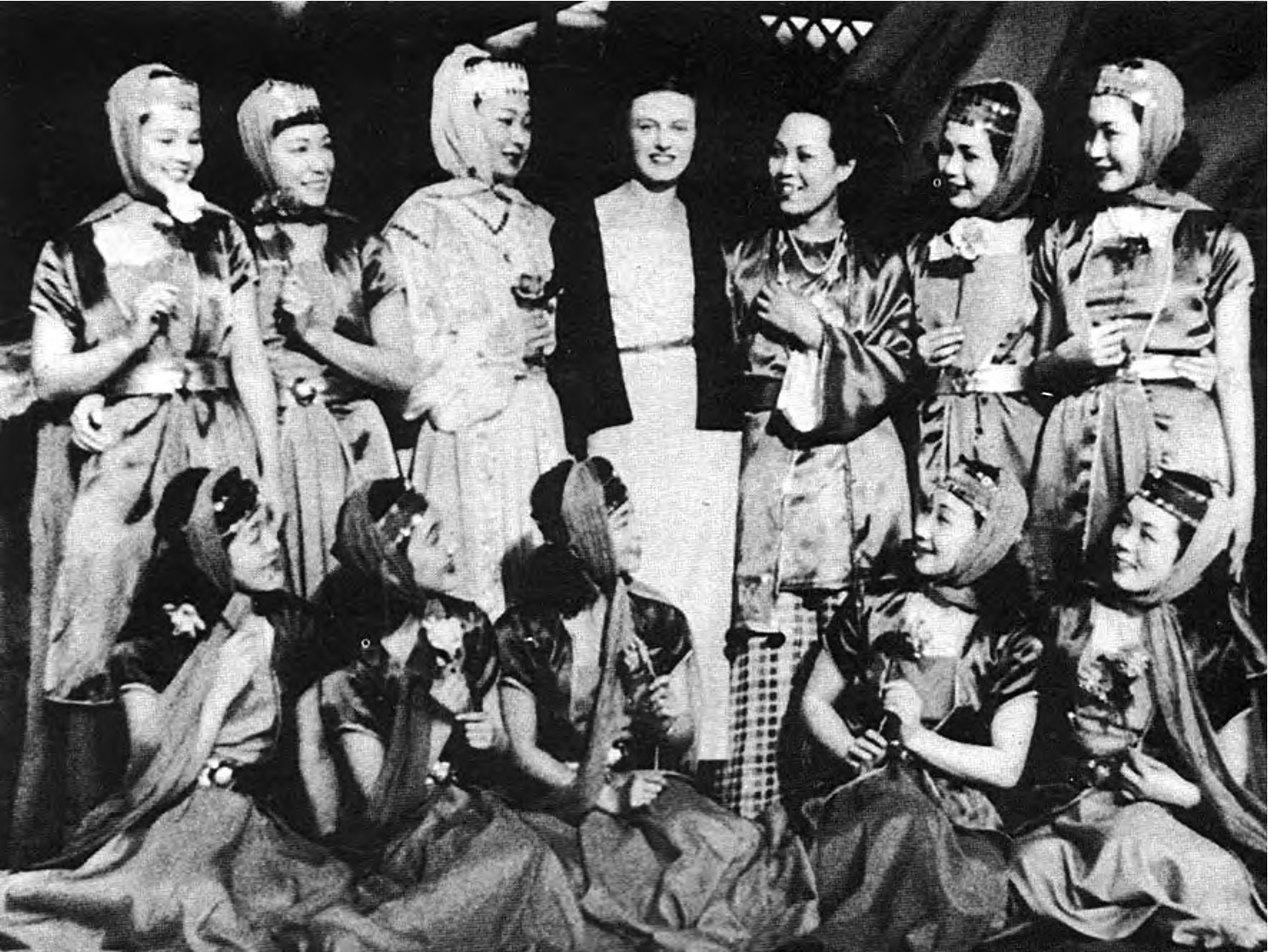
Sapphire and the Japanese theater dance group, 1936

On 27 December 1935 Pavlova received her Japanese passport; the following April, together with Shimizu, she moved to Tokyo. Pavlova worked with Toyokichi Hata, director of Kobayashi's theater to prepare for the first production of Dance of the Little Swans from Swan Lake. The audience did not understand the production, which was perceived as a foreign jazz dance. Only when Hata traveled abroad two years later and saw a performance of Swan Lake in New York City, was he able to appreciate the performance Pavlova had choreographed. She recognized that if she wanted to teach or dance, she would have to become the producer and handle all aspects of the performance, including choreography, costumes, dance training, lighting, music selection and staging, while learning about the language and culture of Japan. She served as the ballet instructor for the Nichigeki Dancing Team, and was employed by the Nippon Gekijo Theatre, a variety theater.

Her premiere as Midori Aoyama in Japan was at the Takarazuka Theater on 12 October 1936, when she danced eight numbers for publicity. After this performance, she began using the stage name Olga Sapphire, to keep her connection with Russia. She partnered with Azuma Yusaku, who had been trained by Eliana Pavlova (Note: The first Russian woman to teach social dancing and open a ballet school in Japan was Eliana Pavlova, who arrived in the country in 1919. She had not been classically trained, nor was she "fully qualified [as a] ballet instructor". Her area of focus was producing ballet for the stage and popularizing it, rather teaching the theory and tradition behind Russian classical ballet.) Between 1936 and 1938, they performed at the Nihon Gekijō. She was the only Western performer at the theater at the time and served as its prima ballerina, as well as choreographer and teacher. Besides classical Russian ballet, Sapphire choreographed Japanese dances. In 1938, she created and directed Impressions of the Orient (Japanese: Tōyō no inshō), a two-act production. She continued to dance classical ballet regularly at the Nehon Gekijō throughout the Pacific War, though almost all other theatrical performances had been suspended. In 1942, she performed the lead role in Scheherazade to a sold out house at the Takarazuka Theater and in 1943, she performed in the Burmese Peacock.

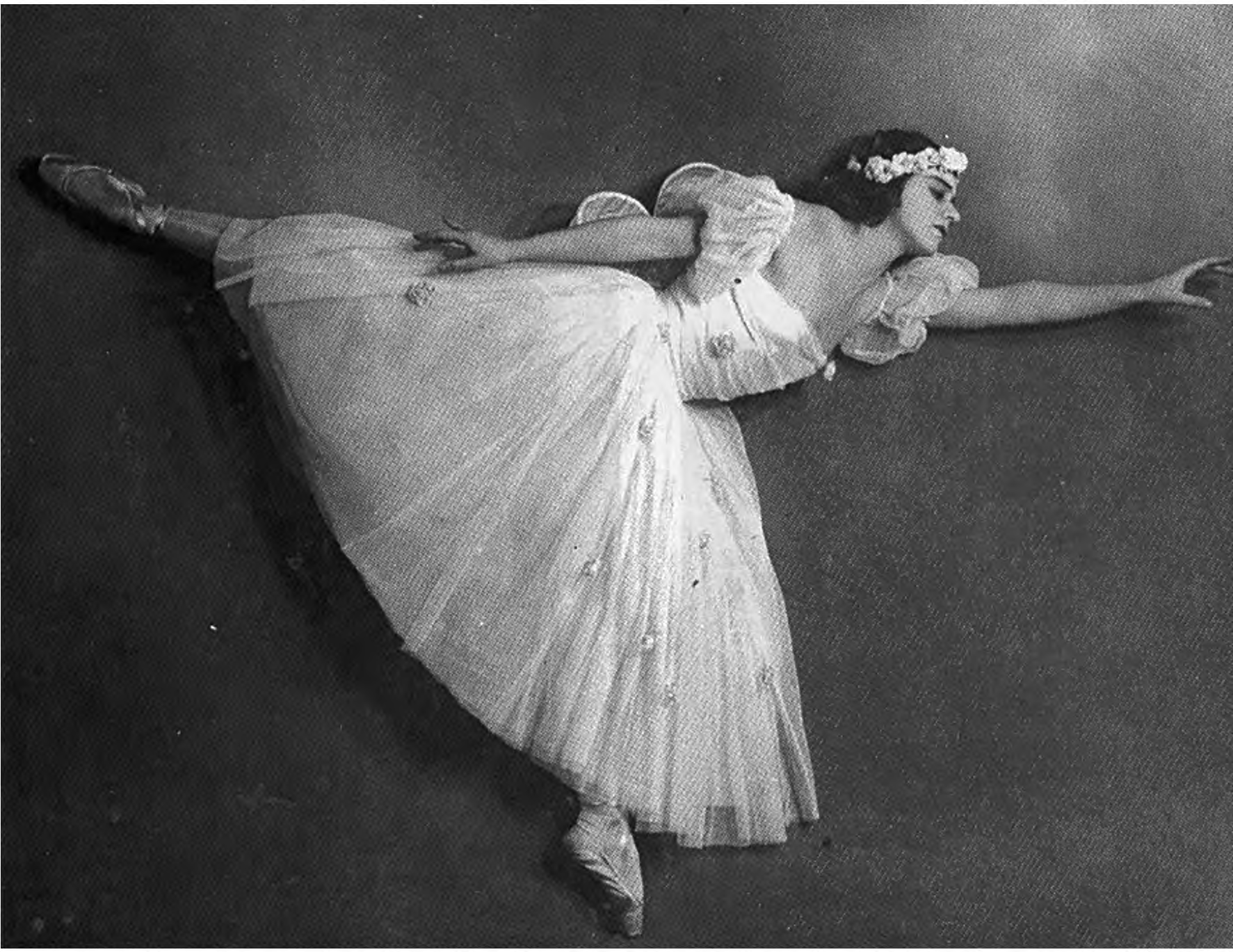
Sapphire in Giselle, 1936

In addition to working on stage, Sapphire became involved in creating dance scenes in film. Her choreography featured in Masahiro Makino's 1943 remake of Orphans of the Storm, Ahen senso (Opium War). After the war, Kobayashi and Hata faced reprisals for their war activities, and Sapphire lost her primary backers. She left the Takarazuka Theater but continued to dance in stage productions, such as her version of Carmen using a musical arrangement by Shiro Matsumoto, a shortened version of Swan Lake, and scenes from The Nutcracker. In 1950, she published a book バレエ読本 (Ballet Reader), which was referred to in Nobel Prize-winning author Yasunari Kawabata's 1951 book, 舞姫 (Dancing Girl), which evaluates the impact of cultural exchange. Her last performance was in 1953, though she continued working to promote Japanese ballet until 1957. In 1960, Sapphire accompanied her husband to a diplomatic post in Poland for three years, before returning to Japan.

== Death and legacy ==
Sapphire died in Tokyo on 20 June 1981. She published three books that were influential on the growth of ballet in Japan, documenting the methods she applied as well as the struggles she faced in introducing ballet in a sufficiently cultural and sensitive way for it to be understood. Among her students were Akemi Matsuo, Junko Matsuyama, and Momoko Tani. Her last student, Toshiko Sato published a book about Saphhire's life in 1987 and hosted annual events in her honor for many years. In 2001 and again in 2016, Chacott, an international firm selling ballet equipment, hosted an exhibit of artifacts belonging to Sapphire. These included a complete collection of Leo Tolstoy's works and other literary books, a collection of materials related to dance history and pedagogy, and sheet music, which after 1936 could not be exported.

== Selected works ==
- Sapphire, Olga; サファイア, オリガ (1950). Bare dokuhon (バレエ読本) [Ballet Reader] (in Japanese). Translated by Shimizu, Takehisa; 清水, 威久. Tokyo: Sanno shobo (山王書房). OCLC 54737697., reprinted 1980 as ISBN 978-4-7603-0137-9
- Sapphire, Olga; サファイア, オリガ (1953). Bare wo kokorozasu Wakai Hitotachi e (バレエを志す若い人たちへ) [For Young People Aspiring to Ballet] (in Japanese). Translated by Shimizu, Takehisa; 清水, 威久. Kawade Shobo (河出書房). OCLC 673983792., reprinted 1980 as ISBN 978-4-7603-0138-6
- Sapphire, Olga; サファイア, オリガ (1982). Watashi no bare henreki (わたしのバレエ遍歴) [Ballet: My Life] (in Japanese). Translated by Shimizu, Takehisa; 清水, 威久. Tokyo: Kasumigaseki shuppan (霞ケ関出版). OCLC 33520162.

== See also ==
- Yoko Morishita
- Matsuyama Ballet Troupe (ja)
- Foreign-born Japanese
- List of prima ballerinas
- List of Russian ballet dancers
