= Maria Skorsiuk =

Russian ballet dancer (1872–1901)

Maria Sergeyevna Skorsiuk (Russian: Мария Сергеевна Скорсюк; 1872 – 15 January 1901) was a Russian ballet dancer who performed with the Imperial Russian Ballet (now the Mariinsky Ballet) from 1890 to 1900. She held the rank of coryphée and specialized in character roles. Skorsiuk is believed to be the first dancer of African heritage to be part of the Imperial Ballet.

== Early life ==
Skorsiuk was born in 1872 in Saint Petersburg. Her father came from Luga and belonged to the lower urban class. According to ballet historian Peter Koppers, she may have descended from African court servants who served in the Russian court from the 17th century.

== Training ==
Skorsiuk joined the Imperial Theatre School as a state scholar. Her teacher Ekaterina Vazem described her physical appearance in her memoirs as having "distinctive features of a purely African type". After the Spring examinations held in 1888, theatre officials attempted to expel Skorsiuk on the grounds of lack of progress or ability. Vazem felt this position to be spurious, strongly opposed the decision and secured a second examination for her student. Skorsiuk passed this examination with flying colours according to Vazem, and continued her studies.

== Career ==
=== Early performances (1890–1895) ===
Skorsiuk graduated in 1890 and joined the Imperial Ballet. She appeared as one of the Four Young Maidens in the world premiere of Marius Petipa's The Sleeping Beauty (1890). In her first season, she performed in 40 ballet performances and 18 opera performances. Critic Alexander Plescheyev reviewed her graduation performance, writing that she "danced with fire, vivacity and energy."

She performed the Spanish Dance in the 1895 revival of Swan Lake choreographed by Petipa and Lev Ivanov.

=== Later roles (1896–1899) ===
In 1896, Skorsiuk performed the role of Morena in Petipa's revival of Mlada. Plescheyev noted her "expressive face and passionate interpretation" in this role. In 1897, she danced O-Gen-Mi in Ivanov's The Mikado's Daughter, performing with Enrico Cecchetti.

For the 1898 premiere of Raymonda, Petipa created the Saracen Dance for Skorsiuk and Alexander Gorsky. The duet ended with the female dancer leaning back in what was described as a "whipcrack position".

Her last recorded new role was in the Forban Dance in Le Corsaire (1899).

== Performances ==
Skorsiuk's documented performances include:
The Sleeping Beauty (1890) – Young Maiden
Nenuphar (1890) – Heinrich
The Vestal (1890) – Jalousie
Kalkabrino (1891) – Member of smuggler's band
Le Roi Candaule (1891) – Peltata and Bacchante
Mlada (opera version, 1892) – Indian Gypsy, Cleopatra
Cinderella (1893) – Fire
Coppélia (1893) – War and Discord
Swan Lake (1895) – Spanish Dance
The Little Humpbacked Horse (1895) – First Wife of the Khan
Mlada (ballet version, 1896) – Morena
The Mikado's Daughter (1897) – O-Gen-Mi, Javanese Dance, Winter
Raymonda (1898) – Saracen Dance, Palotas
Le Corsaire (1899) – Forban Dance

== Assessments by contemporaries ==
Alexander Shiryaev, who partnered with Skorsiuk, wrote in his memoirs: "Maria Skorsiuk possessed a weak dance technique, but her mulatto-like appearance made her irreplaceable in various exotic dances, to which she brought a genuine temperament."

Dance historian Mikhail Borisoglebsky stated that according to contemporary descriptions Skorsiuk could "compete successfully with Marie Petipa" in character roles.

== Death ==
Skorsiuk suffered from consumption, now known as tuberculosis. She made one appearance in the 1899-1900 season before being placed on sick leave. The Imperial Theatre paid for her medical treatment on two occasions. She died on 15 January 1901 at age 28 or 29.

In October 1900 the Theatr i Isskustvo magazine's reviewer suggested that her replacements in The Nutcracker and The Little Humpbacked Horse were inferior to Skorsiuk's performances.

== See also ==
- Mariinsky Ballet
- Marius Petipa
- List of Russian ballet dancers

== Bibliography ==
Borisoglebsky, Mikhail. Materials for the History of Russian Ballet vol. II.
Koppers, Peter. "Maria Skorsiuk." The Marius Petipa Society. 3 January 2021.
Legat, Nikolai. The Story of the Russian Ballet School.
Pleshcheyev, Alexander Alexeyevich (1899). Наш балет, 1673-1899 (Our Ballet), 2nd supplemented ed.
Shiryaev, Alexander. The Petersburg Ballet (Iz vospominanii artista Mariinksogo Teatra).
Vazem, Ekaterina. Memoirs of a Ballerina of the St Petersburg Bolshoi Theatre, 1867-1884.
Wiley, Roland John (1997). The Life and Ballets of Lev Ivanov. Oxford, UK: Clarendon Press.
