= Ukrainian Dancers =

Series of pastels by Edgar Degas

Ukrainian Dancers is a theme series of pastels by Edgar Degas depicting Ukrainian women performing folk dances. Degas created these drawings during the 1890s and early 1900s.

Degas used the name "Les danseuses russes" ("Russian [female] dancers") and it was known under this name in English and French sources, despite vast ethnographic and art historical evidence for the Ukrainian origin of the women

There were a number of voices calling for changing the misleading "Russian" name, criticizing it as "deliberate or just lazy misinterpretation" of Ukraine for many years. These calls intensified with the beginning of Russian invasion in Ukraine in February 2022. The increased focus prompted London's National Gallery to rename a drawing from its collection Ukrainian dancers in April 2022.

In February 2023 Metropolitan Museum changed the name of one of the pastels to Dancers in the Ukrainian dress after calls from Ukrainian representatives including an art historian and journalist. As of May 2023 in the National Museum of Stockholm another work from the series was changed to Three Dancers in Ukrainian Dress.

== Pastels ==
There are at least 18 pastels and sketches of Ukrainian dancers created by Degas, mostly in the second half of the 1890s.

Lisa Bixenstine classifies them as 6 finished pastels, 4 unfinished ones, and 8 sketches.

Artwork	Year	Technique	Canvas(cm)	Catalogue	Collection	Reference
	1894	pastel	54 x 34	MS 390	private collection	
	1895	pastel and charcoal	48 x 67	MS 392	private collection	
	1895-1899	tracing paper, pastel, charcoal	62 x 67	MS 383	Nationalmuseum (Stockholm, Sweden)	
	1898	pastel and charcoal	73 x 59	MS 389	private collection	
	1898	Pastel, charcoal and black chalk on paper mounted on cardboard	67 x 57	MS 394	Museum of Fine Arts (Houston, United States)	
	1899	tracing paper, pastel, charcoal	62,2 x 62,9	MS 384	Museum of Fine Arts (Houston, United States)	
	1899	paper, pastel	62,9 x 64,7	MS 385	Metropolitan Museum of Art (New York, United States)	
	1899	tracing paper, pastel, charcoal	61,9 x 45,7	MS 387	Metropolitan Museum of Art (New York, United States)	
	1899	pastel	58,4 x 76,2	MS 391	private collection	
	1899	Pastel and charcoal on 5 sheets of paper mounted on cardboard	73 x 59,1	MS 393, MS 1845	National Gallery (London, Great Britain)	
	1899	tracing paper, pastel, charcoal	59,3 x 38	MS 1533	private collection	
	1900-1905	paper, pastel, charcoal	98,3 x 75,5	MS 1204	private collection	
	с. 1899	paper, pastel, charcoal	63 x 60,8		private collection	
	1900-1905	paper, pastel, charcoal	54 x 71,1		private collection	

== Sources ==
- Bixenstine, L. R. (1987). Edgar Degas' Russian dancers series (1897-99): their dating, pastel technique, and their context within his late period (1885-1908) (PhD thesis). The Ohio State University.

== Literature ==
- Richard Kendall and Jill DeVonyar. Degas and the Ballet: Picturing Movement. Exhibition catalog, Royal Academy of Arts. London, 2011, pp. 19, 227, 229–31, 237
- David Bomford et al. in Art in the Making: Degas. Exhibition catalog, National Gallery. London, 2004
