= Svetlana Adyrkhaeva =

Russian ballet dancer (1938–2023)

Svetlana Adyrkhayeva
- Светлана Адырхаева
- Born: Svetlanæ Dzantemyry chyzg Аdyrkhaty; 12 May 1938; Khumalag, North Ossetian ASSR, Russian SFSR, Soviet Union
- Died: 27 August 2023 (aged 85); Moscow, Russia
- Education: Leningrad State Choreographic Institute (now Vaganova Academy of Russian Ballet)
- Occupation: Ballerina
- Employer: Bolshoi Theatre
- Awards: People's Artist of the USSR

Svetlana Dzantemirovna Adyrkhaeva (Note: Russian: Светлана Дзантемировна Адырхаева, romanized: Svetlana Dzantemirovna Adyrkhayeva; Iron Ossetic: Светланæ Дзантемыры чызг Адырхаты, romanized: Svetlanæ Dzantemyry chyzg Adyrkhaty) (12 May 1938 – 27 August 2023) was a Soviet and Russian Ossetian ballerina. She was named a People's Artist of the USSR in 1984.

== Biography ==
Adyrkhaeva was born on 12 May 1938 in a village of Khumalag in North Ossetia. She received ballet training at the Leningrad State Choreographic Institute and graduated from there in 1955. Three years later she danced Odette-Odile (in Tchaikovsky's Swan Lake) and won first prize for it. She was a soloist with the Chelyabinsk Opera and Ballet Theatre from 1955 to 1958 and the Odessa State Academic Theatre from 1958 to 1960.

In 1960, she became a soloist with the Bolshoi Ballet, a position she held until 1988. There, she became Galina Ulanova's disciple and also received further mentorship from Marina Semyonova. She participated in a ballet for two generations, playing characters such as Aegina in Spartacus, and many others. From 1978 to 1981, she was member of the Russian Institute of Theatre Arts from which she graduated in 1980 and became a teacher there a year later. From 1995 to 2001, she was a teacher at the Dance Academy of the New Humanitarian University of Natalia Nesterova and then held the same position at the Bolshoi Theater from 2001.

Adyrkhaeva died on 27 August 2023, at the age of 85.
