= Liudmila Titova (ballerina) =

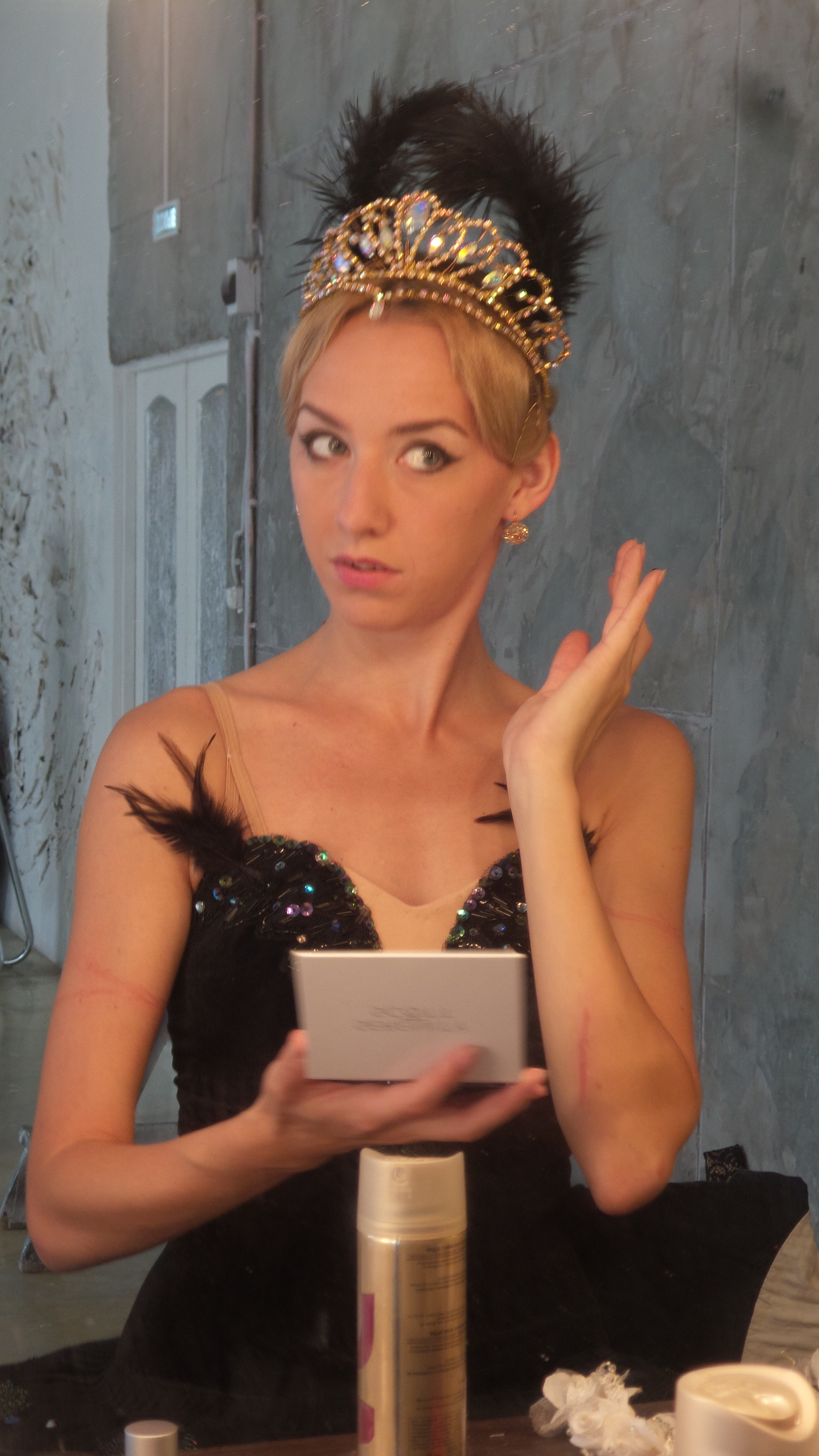
- Liudmila Titova preparing as Black Swan
- Born: Pearl Eileen Primus; October 9, 1987; Moscow, Russia SSR, Soviet Union
- Occupation: Dancer
- Height: 5'9 in (175 cm)
- Career
- Dances: Ballet

Liudmila Titova (Russian: Людмила Титова) is a professional ballet dancer.

== Early life and dance training ==
Titova was born on October 9, 1987, in Moscow, Russia. At the age of ten she was admitted to the Bolshoi Ballet Academy. She trained at the academy for eight years, with a focus on "theatre of classical ballet".

== Professional career ==
At the age of 19, Titova performed the lead role in Sergei Prokoviev's Cinderella. She went on to perform lead roles in other ballets, including The Nutcracker, Don Quixote, Giselle, Boléro, Carmen, Romeo and Juliet, Sleeping Beauty, Swan Lake, and The Time.
