= Vladimir Bourmeister =

Soviet ballet dancer (1904–1971)

- Born: 15 July 1904; Vitebsk, Russian Empire
- Died: 5 March 1971 (aged 66); Moscow, Russian SFSR, Soviet Union
- Occupations: Ballet dancer and master, choreographer
- Years active: 1941–1971
- Known for: Choreography of Swan Lake

Vladimir Pavlovich Bourmeister (Russian: Влади́мир Па́влович Бурме́йстер; 15 July 1904 – 5 March 1971) was a Soviet ballet dancer, ballet master and choreographer best known for his choreography of Swan Lake, a ballet dance by Pyotr Ilyich Tchaikovsky. Made in 1952, his choreography of the dance, unlike other choreographies at the time, was designed to be closely related to the original dance by Tchaikovsky whilst also being modern. The most recognized change in his choreography to the ballet was adding a prologue that showed Odette being turned into a swan by Rothbart. By the end of Bourmeister's choreography, she gets restored to herself. In the Ballroom scene of the dance, Bourmeister made Odile more like an attractive and respectable girl than a seductive vamp to make Siegreid portraying Odette more realistic. Bourmeister's choreography had been played over by the Stanislavsky orchestra. In 1960 the choreography was adopted by the Paris Opera Ballet. When he was invited to choreograph The Snow Maiden (mus. Tchaikovsky) for London Festival Ballet in 1961, he became the first Soviet choreographer to work with a Western company.
