= Natalia Bessmertnova =

Soviet prima ballerina

- Наталия Бессмертнова
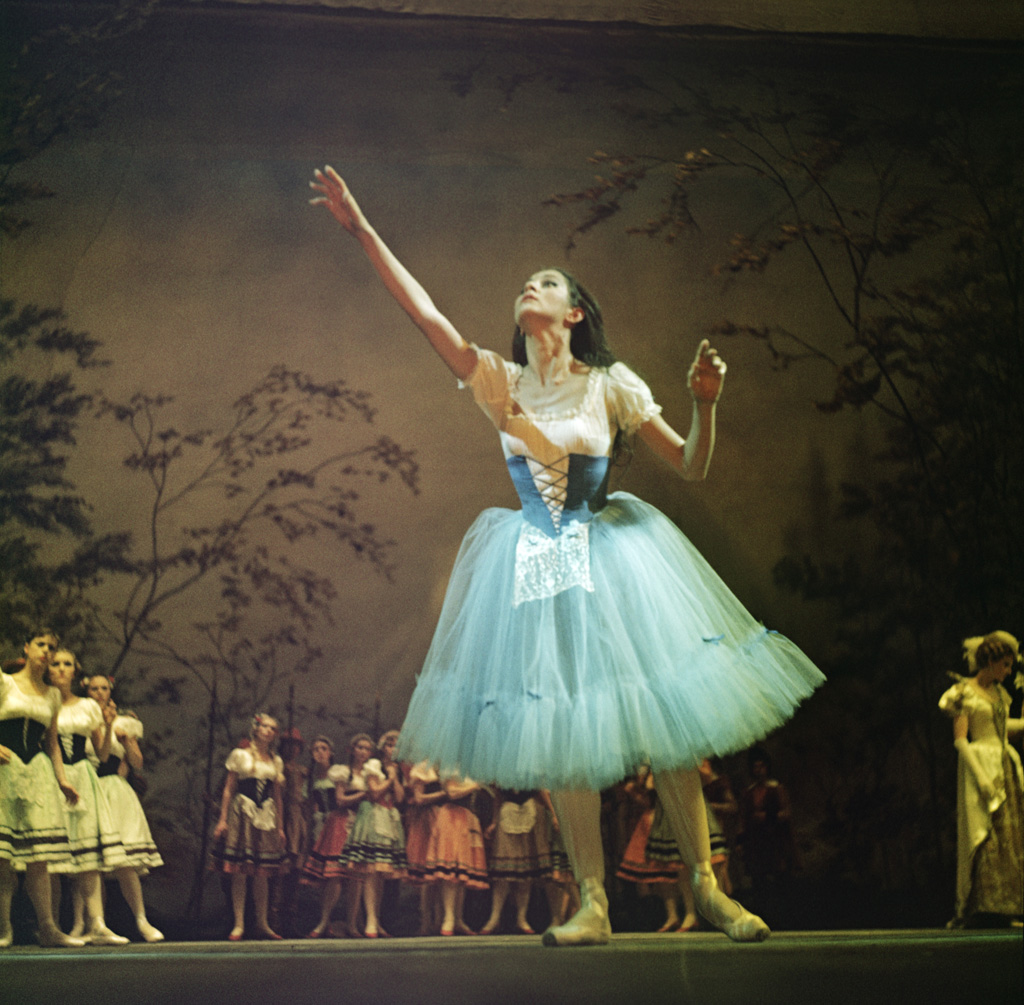
- Bessmertnova as Giselle, 1966
- Born: July 19, 1941; Moscow, Russian SFSR, Soviet Union
- Died: February 19, 2008 (aged 66); Moscow, Russia
- Occupation: Ballerina

Natalia Igorevna Bessmertnova (Note: Russian: Наталия Игоревна Бессмертнова, romanized: Nataliya Igorevna Bessmertnova) (19 July 1941 – 19 February 2008) was a Soviet prima ballerina of the Bolshoi Ballet and a People's Artist of the USSR (1976).

== Life ==
Natalia Bessmertnova was born in Moscow in 1941 and trained at the Moscow State Academy of Choreography from 1953-61. Among her teachers were Sofia Golovkina and Marina Semyonova. She graduated in 1961 as the first student in the school's history receiving A+ in the final examinations. In 1963, she joined the Bolshoi Ballet and was its prima ballerina for three decades. She was married to Yury Grigorovich, former Director and Chief choreographer of the Bolshoi. When he was forced to leave the Bolshoi in 1995, she took part in a historic strike which led to cancellations of scheduled performances.

Bessmertnova died in Moscow on 19 February 2008, aged 66, from cancer. Her sister Tatyana (born 1947) was also a ballet dancer.

== Title roles ==
- Giselle in Lavrovsky's 1963 Giselle production
- Leyli in Goleizovsky's Leyli and Majnun 1964
- Anastasia in Grigorovich's Ivan the Terrible 1975
- Valentina in Grigorovich's Angara 1976
- Juliet in Grigorovich's new Romeo and Juliet 1979
- Rita in Grigorovich's The Golden Age in 1982
- Raymonda in Grigorovich's new Raymonda production 1984, DVD ArtHaus 100719
- Giselle in Grigorovich's Giselle in 1991

== Other important roles ==
- Phrygia in Spartacus
- Odette-Odile in Swan Lake
- Shirin in ''Legend of Love''
- Kitri in Don Quixote
- Maria in The Fountain of Bakhchisarai
- The girl in Le Spectre de la rose

== Awards ==
- Gold Medal at Varna International Ballet Competition in 1965.
- The Anna Pavlova Prize in Paris 1970.
- USSR State Prize (1977) and Lenin Prize (1986).
- People's Artist of the USSR in 1976.

== See also ==
- List of Russian ballet dancers
