= Marina Semyonova =

Soviet ballet dancer

- Марина Семёнова
- Born: 30 May 1908; Saint Petersburg, Russian Empire
- Died: 9 June 2010 (aged 102); Moscow, Russia
- Resting place: Novodevichy Cemetery, Moscow
- Occupations: Prima ballerina; teacher
- Employer(s): Mariinsky Theatre, Bolshoi Theatre
- Awards: People's Artist of the USSR

Marina Timofeyevna Semyonova (Russian: Марина Тимофеевна Семёнова, 30 May [O.S. 17 May] 1908 – 9 June 2010) was the first Soviet-trained prima ballerina. She was named a People's Artist of the USSR in 1975, and a Hero of Socialist Labour in 1988.

== Early life ==
The first great dancer formed by Agrippina Vaganova, she graduated from the Vaganova School in 1925, which "is registered in the annals of Soviet ballet as the year of the unprecedented triumph of Marina Semyonova".

She worked in the Kirov Ballet until 1930 when Joseph Stalin had her and her husband Viktor Semyonov (they were namesakes) transferred to the Bolshoi Theatre in Moscow.

There she married Lev Karakhan (the civil marriage), an Old Bolshevik and Deputy Foreign Minister, best known as an advisor to the Republic of China founder Sun Yat-sen. Karakhan was purged in 1937.

== Career ==
The Soviet dancer Maya Plisetskaya wrote of her that "what she demonstrated in her time was unusual, brand new, breathtaking. Now it is widely believed it has always been that way." The writer Stefan Zweig wrote of her dancing that "when she steps onto the stage with her nature-given gait, which her training only polished, and suddenly soars up in a wild leap, the impression is that of a storm suddenly splitting the quiet of a humdrum existence."

Semyonova was a guest with the Paris Opera Ballet in 1935 where she danced Giselle with Serge Lifar.

She received the Stalin Prize for 1941 and retired in 1952. After that, she became one of the most important teachers and répétiteurs of the Bolshoi Theatre. Natalia Bessmertnova, Marina Kondratieva, Nadezhda Pavlova, Nina Sorokina, Ludmila Semenyaka, Nina Timofeyeva and Nina Ananiashvili were among her adepts.

Semyonova retired from her coaching duties at the age of 96. She is known for her friendship with young danseur Nikolay Tsiskaridze, who interviewed her on several occasions. She also had a daughter with actor Vsevolod Aksyonov. In 2003, she won the Prix Benois de la Danse for lifetime achievement. In 2008, the Bolshoi Theatre celebrated Semyonova's centenary. Semyonova died on 9 June 2010 in her home in Moscow at the age of 102.

== Awards and honors ==
- Honored Artist of the RSFSR (1937)
- Three Orders of the Red Banner of Labour (1937, 1951, 1978)
- Stalin Prize, 2nd class (1941)
- People's Artist of the RSFSR (1951)
- People's Artist of the USSR (1975)
- Order of Lenin (1988)
- Hero of Socialist Labour (1988)
- Order "For Merit to the Fatherland", 3rd class (1998)
- Golden Mask (2007)

== See also ==
- List of Russian ballet dancers
