= Marianna Ryzhkina =

Marianna Ryzhkina (Russian: Марианна Альбертовна Рыжкина) is a Merited Artist of the Russian Federation and principal dancer of the Bolshoi Ballet.

== Biography ==
Ryzhkina was born in Moscow, Russia. She attended and then graduated from the Moscow College of Choreography in 1989 and the same year became a member of Bolshoi Ballet where she player her first pas de deux in Giselle which was produced by Yuri Grigorovich and played in many of his ballets from 1989 to 1995 and rarely in 1996 and 1997. In 1997 she played a role of Kitri in Don Quixote and in 1999 participated in a play called Sleeping Beauty as Princess Florine. In 2001 she played a role of Polish bride in the Swan Lake and the same year performed in La Sylphide with the Royal Ballet of London. In 2004, she reprised her role in Don Quixote with Dresden Ballet and the same year was partnered with Alexander Vetrov to dance The Firebird. The same year she was also awarded the Golden Lyre prize and three years later played as Gamzatti in La Bayadère.
