= Ludmila Semenyaka =

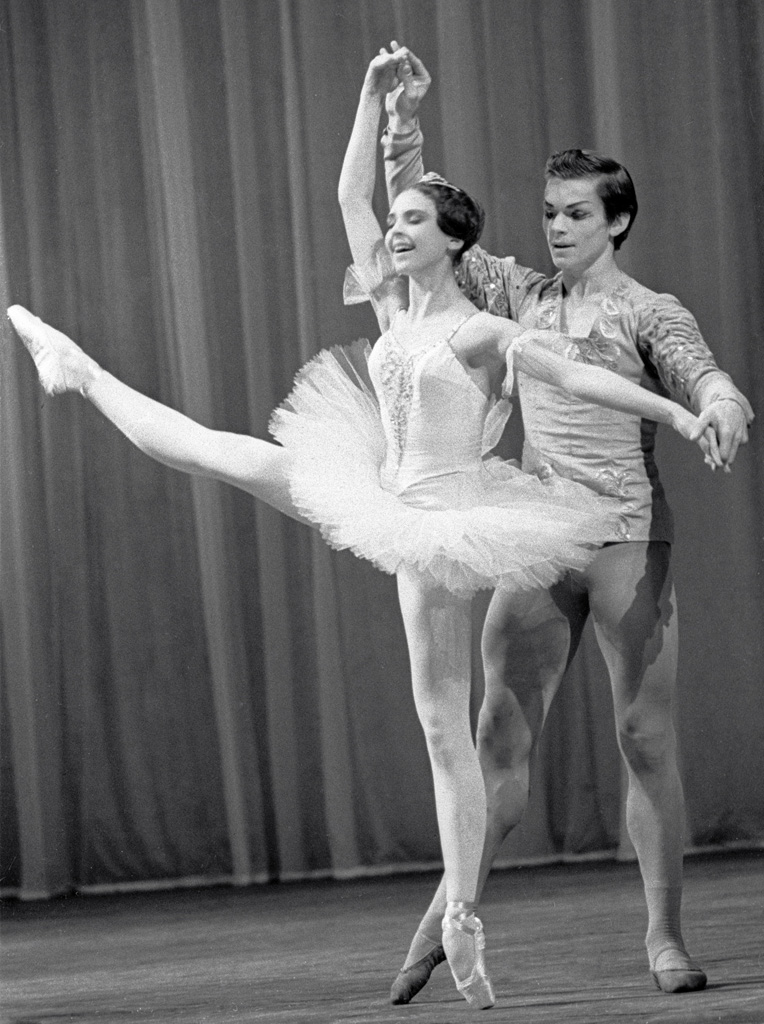
Semenyaka in 1969

Ludmila Semenyaka (Russian: Людмила Семеняка, born 16 January 1952) is a Soviet ballerina, born in Leningrad. She studied at the Vaganova School as a pupil of Nina Belikova. She joined the Kirov Ballet in 1970 and later the Bolshoi Ballet in 1972, where she was a prima ballerina. She was named People's Artist of the USSR in 1986 and received the USSR State Prize.

== See also ==
- List of Russian ballet dancers
