= Sofia Golovkina =

Soviet and Russian ballet dancer, choreographer and teacher

- Софья Головкина
- Born: October 13 1915 [O.S. September 30] Moscow, Russian Empire
- Died: February 17, 2004 (aged 88); Moscow, Russia
- Occupations: Dancer; choreographer; teacher

Sofia Nikolayevna Golovkina (Note: Russian: Софья Николаевна Головкина, romanized: Sofya Nikolayevna Golovkina, sometimes given as Sophia) (October 13 1915 [O.S. September 30] – February 17, 2004) was a Soviet and Russian ballet dancer, choreographer and teacher. A graduate of the Moscow State Academy of Choreography in 1933, she was the principal dancer of the Bolshoi Ballet till 1959. In 1960, she became director of the Moscow Bolshoi Ballet School. For her work, Golovkina was awarded the Russian Order of Merit, People's Artist of the USSR, and the Order of the Red Banner of Labour. She died in 2004 in Moscow.

== Biography ==
Born in Moscow, Golovkina trained with Alexander Chekrygin at the Bolshoi Ballet School, joining the ballet when she was 17. There she danced the leads in the major classical works including Swan Lake, Raymonda, The Sleeping Beauty and Don Quixote. She also created roles as the Tsar-Maiden in Alexander Gorsky's The Little Humpbacked Horse and Zarema in Rostislav Zakharov's The Fountain of Bakhchisaray. In 1943, she danced Nikiya in Gorsky's La Bayadère and in 1947 she performed in Vasili Vainonen's Flames of Paris as Mireille de Poitiers in a work intended to show that the Russian Revolution had a more international context. Her dancing was characterized by a flamboyant virtuosity which was well suited to her patriotic roles during the Soviet era.

After retiring from the stage in 1959, she became director of the ballet school from 1960 where she obtained considerable success with her students, especially Natalia Bessmertnova. Despite unpopularity resulting from her stern approach, she ran the school for 41 years, eventually becoming its rector. Following in the steps of Gorsky and adopting the method developed by Agrippina Vaganova, she contributed to important developments in the Bolshoi's style and repertoire while staging productions for her students including Coppélia (1977) and La Fille mal gardée (1979).

Despite considerable financial difficulties after the end of the Soviet era, Golovinka managed to attract new students and set up a Bolshoi school in Tokyo, Japan as well as a summer school in Vail, Colorado, US. Golovkina also participated as a judge for the prestigious Prix Benois de la Danse.

== Awards ==
Among her many awards, Golovkina received the People's Artist of the USSR (1973), the Order of the Red Banner of Labour (1971) and the Russian Order of Merit (1995).

== Literature ==
- Golovkina, Sophia Nikolaevna (1987). The Bolshoi Ballet School: student life in the world's most prestigious dance school. T.F.H. ISBN 978-0-86622-497-0.
- Morley, Iris (1945). Soviet Ballet. Collins.
