= Nina Timofeeva =

Russian ballet dancer (1935–2014)

- Нина Владимировна Тимофеева
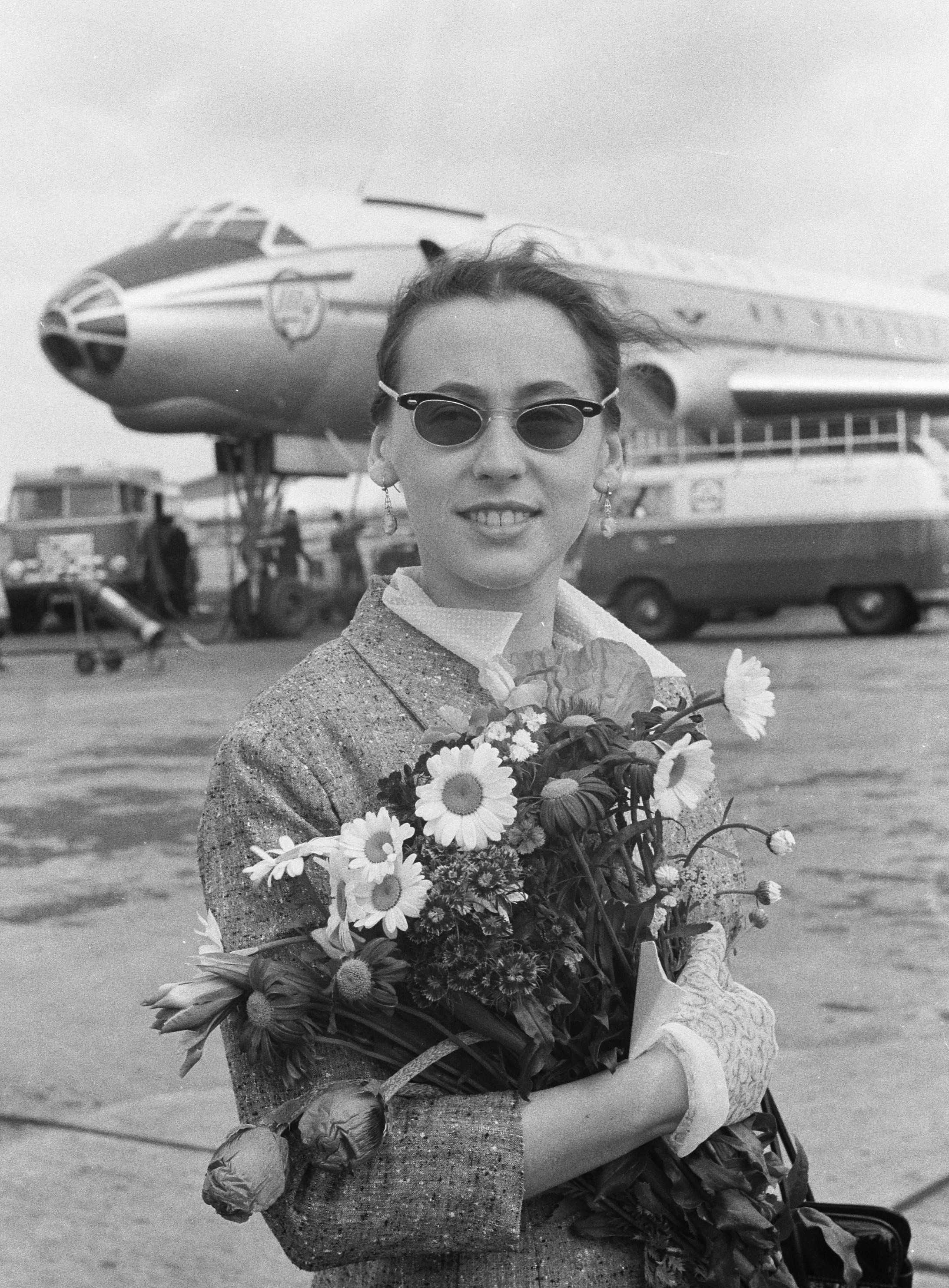
- Timofeeva in 1960
- Born: Nina Vladimirovna Timofeeva; 11 June 1935; Leningrad, Russian SFSR, Soviet Union
- Died: 2 November 2014 (aged 79); Jerusalem, Israel
- Resting place: Givat Shaul Cemetery

Nina Vladimirovna Timofeeva (Russian: Нина Владимировна Тимофеева; 11 June 1935 – 3 November 2014) was a Soviet ballet dancer.

== Biography ==
Timofeeva was born in Leningrad, Russian SFSR and graduated from the Vaganova Academy of Russian Ballet in 1953. She made her theatrical debut as a student in 1951, as Masha in Tchaikovsky's The Nutcracker. From 1953 to 1956, she was a soloist with the Mariinsky Theatre in Saint Petersburg, and after that became a soloist with the Bolshoi Theater in Moscow. Her major roles included

- Odette-Odile, in Tchaikovsky's Swan Lake (1956, 1970)
- Kitri, in Minkus’ Don Quixote (1959)
- The Mistress of the Copper Mountain, in Prokofiev's The Tale of the Stone Flower (1959)
- Aurora (1964) and Lilac Fairy (1977), in Tchaikovsky's The Sleeping Beauty (1964)
- Mekhmene-Banu, in Melikov's Legend of Love (1965)
- Leili, in Balasanian's Leili and Medzhnun (1965)
- Frigina, (1958) and Aegina (1968) in Khachaturian's Spartacus
- Lady Macbeth, in Molchanov's Macbeth (1980)

From 1966 to 1970, Timofeeva was a deputy to the Supreme Soviet. She retired from stage performance in 1988, and from 1989 to 1991 worked as a choreographer for the Bolshoi Theater. In 1991, she moved to Israel, together with her daughter Nadya, who is also a professional ballet dancer. Two years later, she published her memoirs, The World of Ballet.

Timofeeva was married twice. Her first marriage was to Gennady Rozhdestvensky. Her second marriage was to the composer Kirill Molchanov (1922–1982), who wrote music for some of her ballets. Timofeeva and Molchanov remained married until his sudden death in 1982, before the start of one her performances of the ballet Macbeth.

Timofeeva died at the age of 79 on November 3, 2014 in Jerusalem. On the same day, she was buried in the Givat Shaul Cemetery. Her daughter from her marriage to Molchanov survives her.
