= Cyril Atanassoff =

Bulgarian dancer originally from France

- Born: June 30, 1941 (age 84); Puteaux, France
- Known for: dancing

Cyril Atanassoff (Bulgarian: Кирил Атанасов; born June 30, 1941) is a French dancer of Bulgarian descent.

== Career ==
Atanassoff was born in Puteaux to a Bulgarian father and French mother. He joined the École de danse de l'Opéra national de Paris in 1953, and worked at the Opera Ballet team in 1957 with the rank of second quadrille; he skipped the rank "first quadrille" and found position as Coryphaeus then became "petit sujet" in 1959 and "grand sujet" in 1960. During his military service (1961–1963), he passed his ballet exam in 1961 and became principal dancer in 1962. He was appointed principal dancer in 1964.

Among his teachers may be mentioned Roger Ritz (which began at the age of 10), Serge Peretti, Victor Gsovski, Harald Lander, Fernando Alonso, Asaf Messerer, Ninel Kurgapkina and Gilbert Mayer. He immediately dance major roles of the repertoire already showing, as Prince Albert of Giselle and Prince Siegfried from Swan Lake in the version of Wladimir Bourmeister after Marius Petipa and Lev Ivanov, Suite en Blanc and the young man Mirage Serge Lifar, the Crystal Palace George Balanchine, and Harald Lander.

At first, he created ballets by Peter Van Dijk, Michel Descombey, George Skibine and affirmed in The Damnation of Faust created for him by Maurice Béjart (1964). He participated in the Paris premiere ballets by George Balanchine (Concerto Barocco) or Maurice Béjart (The Rite of Spring), a role that has most marked his personality. He created the role of Frollo in Notre-Dame de Paris (1965) Roland Petit which it will succeed in that of Quasimodo who became one of his greatest roles.

Equally at home in the romantic and classical ballet, it ensures the premiere of the stage version of La Sylphide by Filippo Taglioni rise in 1972 by Pierre Lacotte for French television and the first complete version of the Opera La Belle Sleeping in the choreography of Alicia Alonso after Marius Petipa (1974). In 1983, it will be an impressive Abderam in the version of Rudolf Nureyev Raymonda. He played a role as a great Ivan the Terrible (1976) in the eponymous ballet Yuri Grigorovich to, according to Sergei Eisenstein's film. In 1979, he founded Orion in Sylvia ballet reassembled by lycette darsonval after Serge Lifar.

He also plays as an actor, for example as the actor in the hilarious role of Zeus in the Pas de Dieux with Gene Kelly.

Atanassoff's main partners are Yvette Chauviré, Claude Bessy, Jacqueline Rayet, Claire Motte, Nanon Thibon, Noella Pontois, Wilfride Piollet, Vulpian Claude, Dominique Khalfouni and later Elisabeth Platel, Monique Loudières, Sylvie Guilhem and Marie-Claude Pietragalla. He also had the privilege of dancing with the dancers of the largest international ballerinas: Alicia Alonso, Eva Evdokimova Galina Samsova, Nina Vyrubova, and Katia Maximova.

Cyril Atanassoff won the Nizhinzkij Prize in 1965 and received the title of Knight of the National French Order of merit, Ordre des Arts et des Lettres and Professor of ballet at the Paris Opera in 1991.

He retired at the age of 45 years (1986), but returns several times on the stage of the Paris Opera as a guest. After teaching classical dance at Conservatoire de Paris (Paris Conservatory), and for the Opera Ballet Corps, he retired but still stands ready to share its experience.
