= Vladimir Djouloukhadze =

Vladimir A. Djouloukhadze
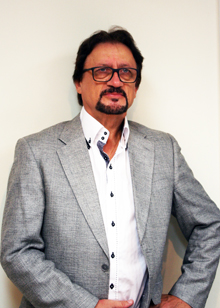
- Vladimir Djouloukhadze in 2017
- Born: 1952 (age 73–74); Tbilisi, Republic of Georgia, USSR
- Occupations: Principal Dancer; Ballet Teacher; Choreographer

Vladimir Djouloukhadze, or Juluhadze, or Djuluhadze, (Russian: Владимир Алексеевич Джулухадзе, Georgian: ვლადიმერ ჟულუხაძე; born in 1952, Tbilisi, Georgian SSR, USSR), is a Georgian ballet dancer, a former principal of the Georgian National Opera and Ballet Theater of Tbilisi, Ballet Master, teacher, and choreographer.

Djouloukhadze is best known as the first performer of the 20th century Georgian ballets and acclaimed for his highly technical and emotional representations of classic roles.

== Education ==
- 1962-1970 - V. Chabukiani Ballet Art State School, Tbilisi, Georgia

Djouloukhadze studied with Tamara Vykhodtseva, Sergei Sologov, choreographer Juri Zaretskii, Margarita Grishkevich (a student of Agrippina Vaganova) and graduated with first honors under the tutelage of the legendary Vakhtang Chabukiani.

- 1981-1986 – Russian Academy of Theatre Arts (GITIS), Master's degree in Ballet Teaching and Choreography

== Honors ==
- 1982 - Honored Artist of the Georgian SSR
- 1987 - Honorary Citizen of the State of Georgia, USA
- 1990 – People's Artist of the Georgian SSR

== Career ==
=== Principal Dancer ===
In 1970 Djouloukhadze joined the Georgian National Opera and Ballet Theater of Tbilisi and quickly moved to the rank of a principal dancer, a position he held until 1990.

His first major role was of Colin in ‘La Fille mal gardée’ followed by Laertes in ‘Hamlet’ (music by Revaz Gabichvadze/ choreography by Vakhtang Chabukiani) in 1972.

Djouloukhadze was the first performer of the Georgian ballets:

- ‘Orpheus and Eurydice‘(Orpheus), music by Gluck - Sulkhan Nasidze / choreography by Zurab Kikaleishvili (1973)
- 'Berikaoba' (Berika), music by Bidzina Kvernadze/ choreography by Georgi Aleksidze (1973)
- 'Chopin on a Theme of Mozart', music by Frédéric Chopin/choreography by Georgi Aleksidze (1973)
- 'Antique Sketches', music by Sulkhan Tsintsadze /choreography Georgi Aleksidze (1974)
- 'Les petits riens’ music by Wolfgang Amadeus Mozart /choreography by Georgi Aleksidze (1974)

Later 'Les petits riens’ was selected by Mikhail Baryshnikov for his solo recital and he came to Tbilisi to rehearse the ballet with Georgi Aleksidze and Vladimir Djouloukhadze.

- ‘Medea’ (Jason), music by Revaz Gabichvadze/ choreography by Georgi Aleksidze (1978)
- 'Four Seasons', music by Antonio Vivaldi / choreography by Georgi Aleksidze (1986)
- 'The Swan of Tuonela', music by Jean Sibelius/ choreography by Georgi Aleksidze (1989)

In 1979 Vakhtang Chabukiani revived the ballet Laurencia for the Georgian National Opera and Ballet Theater of Tbilisi with Vladimir Djoulukhadze and Irina Jandieri in the leading roles.

Vladimir Djouloukhadze (Don José) and Maka Makharadze (Carmen) were the first Georgian performers in Alberto Alonso's ballet Carmen Suite staged by Alexander Plisetski in Tbilisi in 1983.

His neoclassical ballet repertoire includes ‘Notre-Dame de Paris’ (Hunchback) by Roland Petit, Georgi Aleksidze's one-act ballets ‘The Oresteia' (Orest) and ‘Die Fledermaus’. Djouloukhadze also danced solos in Serenade and Theme and Variations by George Balanchine and partnered with Balanchine's niece Tsiskari Balanchivadze.

Vladimir Djouloukhadze was highly acclaimed for his portrayal of the Moor in José Limón's 'The Moor's Pavane' (1986).

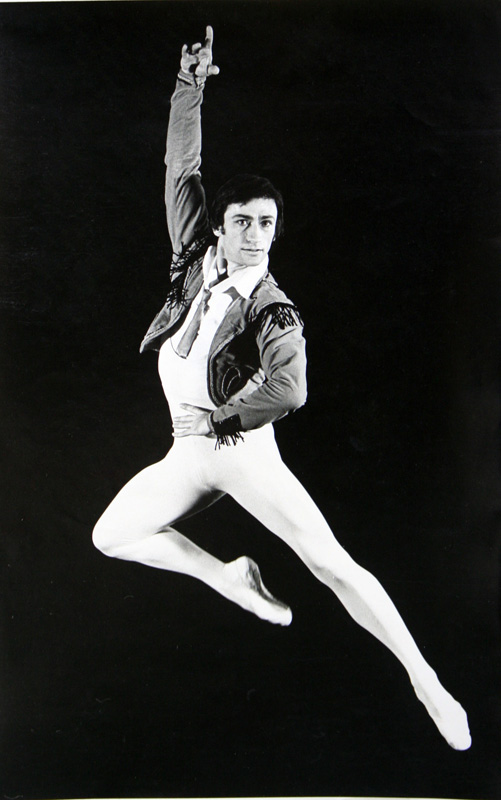
Vladimir Djouloukhadze as Basilio in 'Don Quixote'

He danced principal roles in the following classical ballets and divertissements:

- La Fille mal gardée (Colin)
- Swan Lake (Prince Siegfried)
- Don Quixote (Basilio)
- Giselle (Albrecht)
- Paquita (Divertissement)
- Romeo and Juliet (Romeo)
- Coppélia (Franz)
- Cinderella (Prince)
- The Nutcracker (Prince)
- Flames of Paris (Jérôme)
- Les Sylphides (Poet)
- Sleeping Beauty (Prince Désiré)
- Le Corsaire (Slave)
- Diana and Actaeon (Divertissement)
- Raymonda (Divertissement)

Vladimir Djouloukhadze was praised as an attentive and supportive partner. He partnered with prima-ballerinas of various leading ballet companies, including Irina Jandieri, Nadezhda Pavlova, Alla Khaniashvili, Ludmila Semenyaka, Lubov Kunakova, and Nina Ananiashvili.

During his career Djouloukhadze worked with distinguished ballet-masters and choreographers Konstantin Sergeyev, Natalia Dudinskaya, Georgi Aleksidze, Alexander Plisetskiy, Vladimir Vasiliev, Mikhail Lavrovsky, Lev Asaulyak, Alexander Prokofiev, Raisa Struchkova, Fea Balabina, Evgeni Valukin, Oleg Vinogradov, Tatiana Vecheslova, Natalia Ryzhenko, and Vladimir Nikonov.

Djouloukhadze toured the world with the 'Stars of the Bolshoi Ballet', 'Stars of the Soviet Ballet' and ‘Ballet Stars of Moscow, Kiev and Tbilisi’ along with such great ballet dancers as Maya Plisetskaya, Māris Liepa, Marina Kondratieva, Vyacheslav Gordeev, Vilen Galstyan, Malika Sobirova, Valeri Kovtun, Tatiana Tajakina, Nina Sorokina, Yuri Vladimirov, Nina Semizorova, Vadim Pisarev and others.

He performed as a principal dancer and a guest soloist with various companies, including the Bolshoi Ballet, Kiev Ballet, Baku Ballet, and Universal Ballet.

During his career Vladimir Djouloukhadze performed in over 20 countries in Europe, Asia, America and Africa.

In 1990 he coached a Georgian ballerina Irma Nioradze (a winner of the bronze medal) for the USA International Ballet Competition in Jackson, Mississippi and performed as her non-competitive partner.

Djouloukhadze moved to the U.S. in 1991 and served as a Ballet Master and artistic director for the Ballet Mississippi, Jackson, Mississippi, until 1993.

=== Ballet Teacher ===
Vladimir Djouloukhadze started his career as a ballet teacher at the V. Chabukiani Ballet Art State School in 1980. In the USA he served as a director of the Mississippi Ballet School (1991–1993), a faculty member of the Kirov Academy of Ballet (1993–2008), and the Washington Ballet School (2008–2017). After leaving the school he started private ballet coaching.

Djouloukhadze has been developing his students into the winners of major international ballet competitions, including the Varna International Ballet Competition, the USA International Ballet Competition, Helsinki International Ballet Competition, Paris International Dance Competition, Paris International Contemporary Dance Competition, Shanghai International Ballet Competition, Nagoya International Ballet Competition, and YAGP.

Djouloukhadze's students have gone on to become principals, soloists and members of some of the world's most prominent companies, including the Royal Ballet, American Ballet Theatre, Mariinsky Ballet, Stuttgart Ballet, San Francisco Ballet, Boston Ballet, Houston Ballet, Washington Ballet, and Norwegian National Opera and Ballet. To name a few, Michele Wiles, Jonathan Jordan, Evan McKie, Brooklyn Mack, Rasta Thomas, Danny Tidwell, Matthew Golding, Melissa Hough, Rory Hohenstein, Chauncey Parsons, and Constantine Allen.

Djouloukhadze moved to the U.S. in 1991 and served as a Ballet Master and artistic director for the Ballet Mississippi, Jackson, Mississippi, until 1993.

=== Choreographer ===
As a choreographer Vladimir Djouloukhadze worked for the Tbilisi Griboedov Theater, Tbilisi Nodar Dumbadze Professional State Youth Theatre, the Shota Rustavli Georgian Theater, a Russian illusionist Igor Kio for his show in Tbilisi and the Georgian National team of Rhythmic gymnastics. He also choreographed pieces for ice skaters and worked with Tommy Steenberg, Rachel Parsons, Michael Parsons, Lorraine McNamara, and Quinn Carpenter.

Djouloukhadze choreographed one-act ballets in neoclassical style ‘Reflections’ (music by Sergei Prokofiev) and ‘Dancing with Verdi’(music by Giuseppe Verdi), pieces in academic character style -‘Jota Aragonesa’ (music by Mikhail Glinka), ‘Tarantella’ (music by Louis Gottschalk), and ‘Scheherazade’ (music by Nikolai Rimsky-Korsakov. He also staged The Nutcracker and ballet showcases for the Mississippi Ballet company and ‘Peasant Dances’ from ballet ‘Giselle’ for the Peabody Dance of Johns Hopkins University. His works received numerous prizes at various dance competitions, including YAGP and Showbiz National Talent.

== Filmography ==
- Medea, Georgia-film, 1979
- Laurencia, Georgian TV, 1979
- The Swan of Tuonela, Georgian TV,1990
