= Ivan the Terrible (Prokofiev) =

1945 film score by Sergei Prokofiev

Ivan the Terrible (Russian: Иван Грозный, romanized: Ivan Grozny), Op. 116, is the score composed by Sergei Prokofiev for Sergei Eisenstein's film Ivan the Terrible (1945) and its sequel (1958), the first two parts of an incomplete trilogy.

In 1973 the composer Mikhail Chulaki and choreographer Yuri Grigorovich drew on Prokofiev's film score and other music to create the ballet Ivan the Terrible for the Bolshoi Ballet, which was given its premiere in 1975. Later performing editions of the scores include an oratorio put together by Michael Lankester (1989), and a concert scenario by Christopher Palmer (1991). The restoration of the entire original film score has been published and recorded.

== History ==
=== Composition history ===
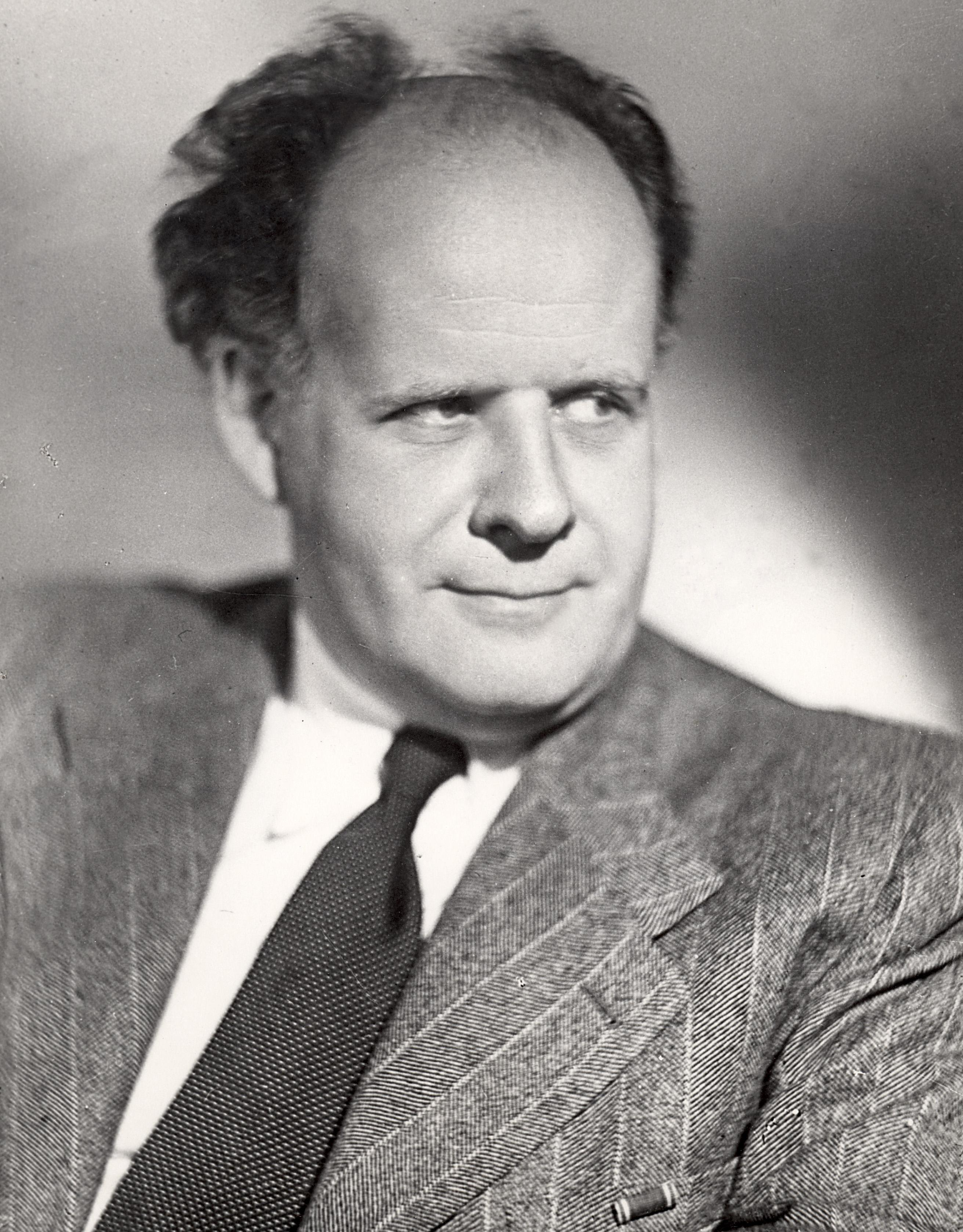
Sergei Eisenstein

Sergei Prokofiev composed the first part of the film score for Ivan the Terrible for Sergei Eisenstein's 1945 film Ivan the Terrible, based on the life of Ivan the Terrible. The project was Prokofiev's second collaboration with Eisenstein, the first being the popular Alexander Nevsky (1938). The majority of the non-liturgical song texts were written by Vladimir Lugovskoy, who collaborated with Prokofiev on the texts for Alexander Nevsky. Prokofiev also composed the score for its 1958 sequel. A planned third part of a trilogy was not performed.

=== Performance history ===
The film Ivan the Terrible (Part One) premiered on 30 December 1944. The sequel, The Boyar Conspiracy (Part Two), was not shown until 1958.

The concert premiere of the soundtrack film score, as restored by Frank Strobel, took place on 16 September 2016 at the Musikfest Berlin, accompanied by a showing of the film in the Great Hall of the Konzerthaus Berlin. Strobel conducted the Rundfunk-Sinfonieorchester Berlin and the Rundfunkchor Berlin, with soloists Marina Prudenskaya (contralto) and Alexander Vinogradov (bass).

=== Publication history ===
- 1958, 'Songs and Choruses from the Music for the Film Ivan the Terrible', vocal scores, published by Levon Atovmyan in the magazine Sovetskaya Muzyka; the six numbers included:
1. 'The Black Cloud'
2. 'Ocean-Sea'
3. 'Song of Praise'
4. 'The Swan'
5. 'The Cannoneers'
6. 'Song about the Beaver'
- 1960, 'Songs and Choruses from Cantatas, Oratorios, and Films', published by Levon Atovmyan, vocal scores, Sovetskiy Kompozitor; the numbers from Ivan the Terrible included:
1. 'The Oath of the Oprichniki'
2. 'Song of Fyodor Basmanov and the Oprichniki'
3. 'Song of the Oprichniki'
- 1997, Ivan the Terrible, manuscript film score, full score, edition by Marina Rakhmanova and Irina Medvedeva, Musikverlage Hans Sikorski, Hamburg
- 2016, Ivan the Terrible, soundtrack film score, full score, edition by Frank Strobel, Musikverlage Hans Sikorski, Hamburg

== Structure and content ==
The subject of the "First Tale" (Part 1) is the early years, 1547 to 1565, of the reign of Ivan IV of Russia: his coronation, his intent to curb the powers of the boyars, his wedding, his conquest of Kazan, his almost fatal illness, the poisoning and death of his first wife Anastasia, the formation of the oprichniki, and his abdication.

The "Second Tale" (Part 2), subtitled The Boyar Conspiracy, covers the years 1565 to 1569, and concerns the defection of Prince Kurbsky to Poland-Lithuania, Ivan's disputes with Philip II, Metropolitan of Moscow, the intrigues of the boyars, the excesses of the oprichniki, the attempted coup by the boyars and Ivan's aunt, Yefrosinya Staritskaya, the murder of her son Vladimir Staritsky, and Ivan's triumph over his domestic enemies.

The film scores were not published during Prokofiev's lifetime. They were arranged in 1961 as an oratorio for soloists, chorus, and orchestra by Levon Atovmyan, one of Prokofiev's assistants. However, before this version could be performed, the music received its concert premiere in 1961 in Moscow in the form of an oratorio for speaker, soloists, chorus, and orchestra by Abram Stasevich, who had conducted the film soundtracks for Eisenstein.

== Scoring and instrumentation ==
The two film scores together require a contralto or mezzo-soprano (in 'Ocean-Sea' and 'Song about the Beaver'), a baritone or bass (in 'Song of the Oprichniki'), a bass (in 'Many Years!'), mixed (SATB) chorus, and the following instrumentation:

- Strings: violins I & II, violas, cellos, double basses
- Woodwinds: piccolo, 2 flutes, 2 oboes, english horn, 3 clarinets, E-flat clarinet, bass clarinet, alto saxophone, tenor saxophone, 4 bassoons, contrabassoon
- Brass: 5 horns, 5 trumpets, 3 trombones, 2 tubas
- Percussion: timpani, bass drum, snare drum, triangle, tambourine, cymbals, tam-tam, bells, church bells, glockenspiel, xylophone, wood block, whip
- Other: piano, harp

== Manuscript numbers ==
The numbers in Prokofiev's manuscript scores are listed in the table below. The table can be sorted by clicking on the buttons in the title bar. The default sequence can be restored by refreshing the browser (press F5).

Note: The column marked 'S' shows the numbering of the musical numbers by Musikverlage Hans Sikorski, the publisher of the restored manuscript film score (zeros have been inserted before single digit numbers for sorting purposes). 'A' stands for Anhang (the appendix), which includes the liturgical numbers used in the film that were either arranged by Prokofiev or were not written into his score of Ivan the Terrible.

Key
Pink	Used only in Part 1 of the film
Blue	Used only in Part 2 of the film
Purple	Used both in Part 1 and in Part 2
Gray	Used neither in Part 1 nor in Part 2

No.	S	Title	English	Source	Scoring
01	01	Увертюра	Overture	Prokofiev	Chorus, orchestra
02	02	Смерть Глинской	Death of Glinskaya	Prokofiev	Chorus, orchestra
03	03	Марш молодого Ивана	March of the Young Ivan	Prokofiev	Orchestra
04	04a	Океан-море	Ocean-Sea	Prokofiev	Soloist, chorus, orchestra
05	04b	Океан-море	Ocean-Sea	Prokofiev	Orchestra
06	05	Шуйский и псари	Shuyskiy and the Huntsmen	Prokofiev	Orchestra
07	A01	Кирие элейсон	Kyrie eleison	Liturgy	Chorus
08	A02	Софрониевская херувимская песнь	Sofroniy's Cherubic Song	Monastic song, transcribed by Kastalsky	Chorus
09a	06	Многая лета!	Many Years!	Traditional, arranged by Prokofiev	Chorus, bells
09b	A03	Многая лета!	Many Years!	Traditional	Chorus
10	07	Величание	Praise Song	Prokofiev	Chorus, orchestra
11	08	Лебедь	The Swan	Prokofiev	Chorus, orchestra
12	09	Юродивый	The Holy Fool	Prokofiev	Orchestra
13	10	Бунт	The Riot	Prokofiev	Orchestra
14	11	Выход татар	Entrance of the Tatars	Prokofiev	Orchestra
15	12	Пушки движутся на Казань	The Cannons Move to Kazan	Prokofiev	Orchestra
16	13	Палатка Ивана	Ivan's Tent	Prokofiev	Orchestra
17	14	Степь татарская	Tatar Steppe	Prokofiev	Chorus, orchestra
18	15	Пушкари	The Cannoneers	Prokofiev	Chorus, orchestra
19	16	Татары	The Tatars	Prokofiev	Orchestra
20	17	Трубы Курбского	Kurbskiy's Trumpets	Prokofiev	Brass
21	18	Атака	Attack	Prokofiev	Orchestra
22	19	Зависть Малюты	Malyuta's Jealousy	Prokofiev	Orchestra
23	20	Казань взята	Kazan is Taken	Prokofiev	Orchestra
24	A04	Душе моя	My Soul	Obikhod	Chorus
25	A05	Многомилостиве Господи	Most Merciful Lord	Obikhod	Chorus
26	21	Иван умоляет бояр	Ivan Implores the Boyars	Prokofiev	Orchestra
27	22	Болезнь Анастасии	Anastasiya's Illness	Prokofiev	Orchestra
28	23	Отравление Анастасии	The Poisoning of Anastasiya	Prokofiev	Orchestra
29	A06	Вечная память	Eternal Remembrance	Obikhod	Chorus
30	A07	Со святыми упокой	Rest with the Saints	Obikhod	Chorus
31	A08	Сам един еси	Thou Alone	Obikhod, transcribed by Vinogradov	Chorus
32	24	Иван у гроба Анастасии	Ivan at Anastasiya's Coffin	Prokofiev	Orchestra
33a	25	Клятва опричников	Oath of the Oprichniki	Prokofiev	Chorus, orchestra
33b	25	Клятва опричников	Oath of the Oprichniki	Prokofiev	Chorus, orchestra
34	26	Вернись!	Come Back!	Prokofiev	Chorus, orchestra
35	27	Фанфары	Fanfares	Prokofiev	Brass
36	27a	Полонез	Polonaise	Prokofiev, from Boris Godunov (incidental music, Op. 70a: No. 10)	Orchestra
37	A09	Не рыдай мене, мати	Do not Sob for Me, Mother	Ivanov	Chorus
38	A10	Уне тебе бяше, Иудо	It Were Better for You, Judas	Liturgy	Chorus
39a	28a	Дивен Бог	Wondrous is God	Bortnyansky	Chorus, bells
39b	A11	Дивен Бог	Wondrous is God	Bortnyansky	Chorus
40a	28b	Пение отроков	Singing of the Boys	Prokofiev	3 Boys
40b	A12	?	We Are Innocent and at Their Mercy	?	3 Boys
41	29	Песня про бобра	Song about the Beaver	Prokofiev	Soloist, orchestra
42	30a	Пляски опричников: Хаотическая пляска	Dances of the Oprichniki: Chaotic Dance	Prokofiev	Orchestra
43	30b	Пляски опричников: Организованная пляска	Dances of the Oprichniki: Orderly Dance	Prokofiev	Orchestra
44	31	Куплеты опричников	Song of the Oprichniki	Prokofiev	Soloist, chorus, orchestra
45	31a	Куплеты опричников	Song of the Oprichniki	Prokofiev	Orchestra
46	32a 32b	Хор опричников	Chorus of the Oprichniki	Prokofiev	Chorus, orchestra
47	32c	Убийство Владимира	Vladimir's Murder	Prokofiev	Orchestra
48	33	Выход Ивана	Entrance of Ivan	Prokofiev	Orchestra

The performance duration is about 100 minutes.

Several numbers can be divided into two parts, which are sometimes quoted in the film separately:

- The first half of the 'Overture' is the orchestral 'A Storm Approaches' (the Ivan theme), which is used very liberally in both films as a leitmotiv; the second half is the chorus 'The Black Cloud', which is used only at the beginning of each film as part of the overture.
- The first part of 'The Death of Glinskaya' accompanies, in the second film, the flashback of the poisoning of the 8-year-old-Ivan's mother; the second part is the chorus 'On the Bones of our Enemies' (the sung portion of which was used in neither film).
- The first half of 'Come Back!' depicts the people's chorus of supplication after Ivan's abdication; the second half is the 'Finale' (a variation of 'A Storm Approaches'), which concludes both films.

== Film score cues ==
=== Ivan the Terrible (Part 1, 1944) ===
Scene	Cue	Numbers	Scoring
Overture	1	A Storm Approaches	Orchestra
Overture	1	The Black Cloud	Chorus, orchestra
Overture	1	A Storm Approaches (2 times)	Orchestra
Coronation	2	Bells	Bells
Coronation	2	Kyrie Eleison	Chorus
Coronation	3	Sofroniy's Cherubic Song	Chorus
Coronation	4	To Tsar Ivan, Crowned by God	Bass soloist
Coronation	4	Many Years!	Chorus
Coronation	5	Sofroniy's Cherubic Song	Chorus
Coronation	6	Alliluyya	Chorus
The Wedding	7	Praise Song	Chorus, orchestra
The Wedding	7	Bells	Bells
The Wedding	8	Ivan's Tent	Orchestra
The Wedding	8	The Riot	Orchestra
The Wedding	8	The Swan	Chorus, orchestra
The Wedding	9	The Death of Glinskaya	Orchestra
The Wedding	9	The Riot	Orchestra
The Wedding	10	Entrance of the Tatars	Orchestra
The Wedding	10	A Storm Approaches	Orchestra
The Taking of Kazan	11	The Cannons Move to Kazan	Orchestra
The Taking of Kazan	11	Ivan's Tent	Orchestra
The Taking of Kazan	11	The Tatar Steppe	Chorus, orchestra
The Taking of Kazan	12	The Cannoneers	Chorus, orchestra
The Taking of Kazan	12	The Tatars	Orchestra
The Taking of Kazan	12	The Cannoneers	Chorus, orchestra
The Taking of Kazan	13	Ivan's Tent	Orchestra
The Taking of Kazan	14	Kurbskiy's Trumpets	Brass
The Taking of Kazan	14	Attack	Orchestra
The Taking of Kazan	14	Kazan is Taken	Orchestra
Ivan's Illness	15	My Soul	Chorus
Ivan's Illness	15	Most Merciful Lord	Chorus
Ivan's Illness	16	Ivan Pleads with the Boyars	Orchestra
Ivan's Illness	17	The Tatar Steppe	Chorus, orchestra
The Death of Anastasiya	18	The Poisoning of Anastasiya	Orchestra
The Death of Anastasiya	18	Anastasiya's Illness	Orchestra
The Death of Anastasiya	19	Eternal Remembrance	Chorus
The Death of Anastasiya	19	Rest with the Saints	Chorus
The Death of Anastasiya	20	The Poisoning of Anastasiya	Orchestra
The Death of Anastasiya	20	Ivan at Anastasiya's Coffin	Orchestra
Ivan's Abdication	21	Chorus of the Oprichniki	Chorus, orchestra
Ivan's Abdication	21	Come back!	Chorus, orchestra
Ivan's Abdication	21	Finale	Orchestra

=== Ivan the Terrible: The Boyar Conspiracy (Part 2, 1946) ===
Scene	Cue	Numbers	Scoring
Overture	1	A Storm Approaches	Orchestra
Overture	1	The Black Cloud	Chorus, orchestra
The Polish Court	2	Fanfares	Brass
The Polish Court	2	Polonaise	Orchestra
The Polish Court	2	Fanfares (fragment)	Brass
The Polish Court	2	Polonaise (fragment)	Orchestra
The Polish Court	2	A Storm Approaches	Orchestra
Ivan's Return	3	Orderly Dance	Orchestra
Ivan's Childhood	4	The Death of Glinskaya	Orchestra
Ivan's Childhood	5	Ivan's Tent	Orchestra
Ivan's Childhood	5	A Storm Approaches	Orchestra
Ivan's Childhood	6	Shuysky and the Huntsmen	Orchestra
Ivan's Childhood	6	The Death of Glinskaya	Orchestra
Ivan and Fyodor	7	The Poisoning of Anastasiya	Orchestra
Execution of the Boyars	8	The Death of Glinskaya	Orchestra
Execution of the Boyars	9	Do not Sob for Me, Mother	Chorus
Execution of the Boyars	10	It Were Better for You, Judas	Chorus
The Furnace Play	11	Wondrous is God	Chorus
The Furnace Play	11	We are Innocent and at their Mercy	3 boys
The Furnace Play	12	A Storm Approaches	Orchestra
The Furnace Play	13	We are Innocent and at their Mercy	3 boys
The Furnace Play	14	The Death of Glinskaya	Orchestra
The Boyar Conspiracy	15	Song about the Beaver	Soloist, chorus, orchestra
The Boyar Conspiracy	16	Shuysky and the Huntsmen	Orchestra
The Banquet	17	Chaotic Dance	Orchestra
The Banquet	17	Orderly Dance	Orchestra
The Banquet	17	Chaotic Dance	Orchestra
The Banquet	18	Orderly Dance	Orchestra
The Banquet	18	Chaotic Dance	Orchestra
The Banquet	18	Song of the Oprichniki	Soloist, chorus, orchestra
The Banquet	18	Orderly Dance	Orchestra
The Banquet	18	Shuysky and the Huntsmen	Orchestra
The Banquet	19	Orderly Dance	Orchestra
The Banquet	20	Orderly Dance	Orchestra
The Banquet	20	Song of the Oprichniki	Chorus, orchestra
The Banquet	21	My Soul	Chorus
The Murder	22	Chorus of the Oprichniki	Chorus, orchestra
The Murder	22	Song of the Oprichniki	Chorus, orchestra
The Murder	22	Chorus of the Oprichniki	Chorus, orchestra
The Murder	22	Song of the Oprichniki (fragment)	Orchestra
The Murder	22	Vladimir's Murder	Orchestra
The Murder	23	The Entrance of Ivan	Orchestra
The Murder	24	Song about the Beaver (fragment)	Soloist
The Murder	25	The Oath of the Oprichniki	Chorus, Orchestra
Finale	26	Finale	Orchestra

== Themes ==
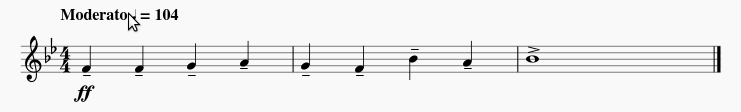
The Ivan Theme

The Ivan Theme

The Ivan theme appears in:

1. 'Overture' (A Storm Approaches)
2. 'Ivan's Tent'
3. 'Ivan at Anastasiya's Coffin'
4. 'Come Back!' (Finale)

== Versions by other hands ==
=== Oratorio by Levon Atovmyan (1961) ===
Performance history

Atovmyan's arrangement was premiered on 28 January 2012 at the Royal Festival Hall, London. Vladimir Jurowski conducted the London Philharmonic Orchestra and Chorus; the soloists were Ewa Podleś and Andrey Breus. That same year, Jurowski also conducted the Russian premiere on 2 April at the Great Hall of the Moscow Conservatory, with singers Elena Zaremba and Andrey Breus; and American premiere on 18 October at Davies Symphony Hall. Zaremba and Breus were also the soloists at the latter performance.

Numbers

Atovmyan's oratorio is in 8 sections, some consisting of several numbers (or parts of numbers) from the film score—refer to 'Sequence' below:

No.	Original	English	Sequence
1	Иван и бояре	Ivan and the Boyars	• A Storm Approaches • The Black Cloud • The Riot • Ivan Implores the Boyars • Come back! • On the Bones of Our Enemies • A Storm Approaches
2	Песня про бобра	Song about the Beaver	Song about the Beaver
3	Опричнина	The Oprichnina	• Chaotic Dance of the Oprichniki • Chorus of the Oprichniki • Orderly Dance of the Oprichniki • Song of the Oprichniki • Oath of the Oprichniki • Orderly Dance of the Oprichniki
4	Лебедь	The Swan	The Swan
5	Анастасия	Anastasiya	• Anastasiya's Illness • The Poisoning of Anastasiya • Anastasiya's Illness
6	Океан-море	Ocean-Sea	• The Entrance of Ivan • Ocean-Sea
7	Взятие Казани	The Taking of Kazan	• Ivan's Tent • The Tatars • Entrance of the Tatars • The Tatars • The Cannoneers • The Cannons Move to Kazan • Kurbskiy's Trumpets • Attack • Kazan is Taken • Ivan's Tent
8	Величание	Praise Song	• March of the Young Ivan • Praise Song • The Death of Glinskaya • On the Bones of our Enemies • A Storm Approaches

The performance duration is about 45 minutes.

Scoring and instrumentation

Atovmyan's oratorio is scored for contralto or mezzo-soprano (in 'Ocean-Sea' and 'Song about the Beaver') and baritone (in 'Song of the Oprichniki'), mixed (SATB) chorus, and the following instrumentation:

- Strings: violins I & II, violas, cellos, double basses
- Woodwinds: 2 piccolos, 2 flutes, 2 oboes, english horn, 2 clarinets, E-flat clarinet, bass clarinet, tenor saxophone, 2 bassoons, contrabassoon
- Brass: 4 horns, 5 trumpets, 3 trombones, tuba
- Percussion: timpani, piccolo timpani, bass drum, snare drum, triangle, tambourine, cymbals, tam-tam, bells, xylophone, wood block, whip
- Other: piano, celesta, 2 harps

=== Oratorio by Abram Stasevich (1961) ===
The following commentary, by composer and musicologist Thomas Korganov (1925-2015), was printed in the preface to Stasevich's vocal score in 1961:

"Without adding material of his own or making changes to the composer's manuscript, A. Stasevich approached the music for the film in a creative manner turning it into an oratorio consisting of 20 numbers. By repeating certain episodes and sections, and by linking them in a variety of ways, Stasevich was able to turn the various parts of this substantial work into self-contained numbers. In order to comply with the dictates of musical logic, he did not always adhere strictly to the order of the musical episodes prescribed by the plot. Thus certain episodes were transformed into tripartite structures, and others expanded to become rather large movements. Certain changes were also made to the orchestration, and certain instrumental lines were reinforced ... Stasevich also added another formal determinant in the shape of a speaker."

Performance history

The premiere took place on 23 April 1961 in the Great Hall of the Moscow Conservatory. Abram Stasevich conducted the Moscow State Philharmonic Orchestra.

Publication history

- 1962, Ivan the Terrible, oratorio by Abram Stasevich, vocal score, Sovetskiy Kompozitor, Moscow
- 1972, Ivan the Terrible, oratorio by Stasevich, full score, Sovetskiy Kompozitor, Moscow

Numbers

Stasevich's oratorio is in 20 movements, some consisting of several numbers (or parts of numbers) from the film score—refer to 'Sequence' below:

No.	Original	English	Sequence
1	Увертюра	Overture	• A Storm Approaches • The Black Cloud • The Death of Glinskaya • Shuyskiy and the Huntsmen • The Death of Glinskaya • The Black Cloud • A Storm Approaches
2	Марш молодого Ивана	March of the Young Ivan	March of the Young Ivan
3	Океан-море	Ocean-Sea	Ocean-Sea
4	Царём буду!	I Shall Be Tsar!	A Storm Approaches
5	Дивен Бог	Wondrous is God	Wondrous is God
6	Многая лета!	Many Years!	• Many Years • Ocean-Sea • Many Years!
7	Юродивый	The Holy Fool	• The Holy Fool • The Riot • The Holy Fool
8	Лебедь	The Swan	• The Swan • Praise Song • The Swan
9	На костях врагов	On the Bones of Our Enemies	On the Bones of Our Enemies
10	Татары	The Tatars	• Entrance of the Tatars (2 times) • The Tatars • Entrance of the Tatars
11	Пушкари	The Cannoneers	• The Cannoneers • Ivan's Tent • The Cannoneers
12	На Казань!	To Kazan!	• The Cannons Move to Kazan • Entrance of Ivan • The Tatar Steppe • Entrance of Ivan • Ivan's Tent • The Tatar Steppe • Ivan theme • Kurbskiy's Trumpets • Attack • Malyuta's Jealousy • Attack • The Tatars • The Cannoneers • Kazan is Taken
13	Иван умоляет бояр	Ivan Implores the Boyars	• Ivan Implores the Boyars • The Tatar Steppe
14	Ефросинья и Анастасия	Yefrosinya and Anastasiya	• The Poisoning of Anastasiya • Anastasiya's Illness • The Poisoning of Anastasiya
15	Песня про бобра (колыбельная Ефросиньи)	Song about the Beaver (Yefrosinya's Lullaby)	Song about the Beaver
16	Иван у гроба Анастасии	Ivan at the Coffin of Anastasiya	Singing of the Boys
17	Клятва Опричников	Oath of the Oprichniki	• Chorus of the Oprichniki • Oath of the Oprichniki
18	Песня Фёдора Басманова с опричниками	Song of Fyodor Basmanov with the Oprichniki	Song of the Oprichniki
19	Пляска Опричников	Dance of the Oprichniki	• Chaotic Dance of the Oprichniki • Orderly Dance of the Oprichniki
20	Финал	Finale	• Ivan at the Coffin of Anastasiya • Come Back! • Finale • On the Bones of Our Enemies • Ivan Theme

Performance duration is about 75 minutes.

Scoring and instrumentation

Stasevich's oratorio is scored for contralto (in 'Ocean-Sea' and 'Song about the Beaver') and baritone (in 'Song of the Oprichniki'), mixed (SATB) chorus, and the following instrumentation:

- Strings: violins I & II, violas, cellos, double basses
- Woodwinds: 3 flutes (including 2 piccolos), 3 oboes (including english horn), 5 clarinets (including E-flat clarinet & bass clarinet), alto saxophone, baritone saxophone, 4 bassoons (including contrabassoon)
- Brass: 4 horns, 5 trumpets, 3 trombones, 2 tubas
- Percussion: timpani, bass drum, snare drum, triangle, tambourine, cymbals, tam-tam, church bells, glockenspiel, xylophone, wood block, metal bar, whip
- Other: piano, 2 gusli, 2 harps

=== Ballet by Mikhail Chulaki (1975) ===
The ballet Ivan the Terrible, arranged by Mikhail Chulaki and choreographed by Yuriy Grigorovich, debuted in February 1975 at the Bolshoy Theatre with Yuri Vladimirov in the title role. The two act (7 scenes) work consists of selections from Prokofiev's film score for Ivan the Terrible supplemented with excerpts from his Symphony No. 3 (1928), Russian Overture (1936), and 'The Field of the Dead' from the film score for Aleksandr Nevskiy (1938).

Performance history

The world premiere performance took place on 20 February 1975 at the Bolshoy Theatre. Algis Zhuraitis conducted. The cast included Yuriy Vladimirov (Ivan), Natalya Bessmertnova (Anastasiya), and Boris Akimov (Kurbskiy).

=== Oratorio by Michael Lankester (1988) ===
Performance history

The premiere took place on 4 May 1988. Michael Lankester conducted the Hartford Symphony Orchestra.

Numbers

This version of Ivan the Terrible consists of 29 numbers.

The performance duration is about 95 minutes.

=== Concert Scenario by Christopher Palmer (1991) ===
Christopher Palmer discusses his Ivan the Terrible concert scenario in the notes to a Chandos CD recording made a few days after the work's premiere:

"...in 1962 Abram Stasevich (1906-1971), who had conducted Ivan for the film soundtrack, published his Ivan the Terrible 'oratorio' for speaker, soloists, chorus and orchestra which incorporated all the major musical sequences in the film plus a few that had been left out (notably 'Russian Sea'). It is in this form that the Ivan music has been known outside the film ever since, and in this form that critics have tended to find it long and diffuse. The main problem is the speaker, introduced by Stasevich primarily because he had been unwise enough to try and incorporate a large number of short fragmentary episodes, and had to find a way of stitching them together. Unfortunately once the speaker was in, he seemed to take over the entire work—much to its detriment in terms of narrative intelligibility and tightness of structure. My new 'performing version' eliminates the speaker and shorter sections (most of which are pastiche Russian-liturgical music of minimal Prokofievian interest). It also restores a number of episodes to their original format, most importantly the assassination of the Pretender in Part II—the climax of the film and one of the most electrifying moments in film music. While retaining Stasevich's make-up of most of the larger movements, I have reverted largely to the film's original sequence of musical events."

Performance history

The concert scenario received its premiere on 28 February 1991 at the Royal Festival Hall in London. Neeme Järvi conducted the Philharmonia Orchestra and Chorus.

Numbers

The 'new' work is in 13 movements, some consisting of several numbers (or parts of numbers) from the film score—refer to 'Sequence' below:

No.	Title	Sequence
1	Overture	• A Storm Approaches • The Black Cloud • The Death of Glinskaya • Shuyskiy and the Huntsmen • The Death of Glinskaya • The Black Cloud • A Storm Approaches
2	Russian Sea	Ocean-Sea
3	Wedding	• The Swan • Praise Song • The Swan
4	Fire	• The Holy Fool • The Riot • The Holy Fool
5	Tartars and Cannoneers	• Entrance of the Tatars (2 times) • The Tatars • Entrance of the Tatars • The Cannoneers • Ivan's Tent • The Cannoneers
6	The Storming of Kazan	• The Cannons Move to Kazan • Entrance of Ivan • The Tatar Steppe • Entrance of Ivan • Ivan's Tent • The Tatar Steppe • Ivan theme • Kurbskiy's Trumpets • Attack • Malyuta's Jealousy • Attack • The Tatars • The Cannoneers • Kazan is Taken
7	Ivan's Sickness	Ivan Implores the Boyars
8	At the Polish Court	• Fanfares • Polonaise
9	Anastasia	• The Poisoning of Anastasiya • Anastasiya's Illness • The Poisoning of Anastasiya
10	Song of the Beaver (Ephrosynia's Lullaby)	Song about the Beaver
11	The Banquet	• Chaotic Dance of the Oprichniki • Orderly Dance of the Oprichniki • Song of the Oprichniki • Chaotic Dance of the Oprichniki • Orderly Dance of the Oprichniki
12	Murder in the Cathedral	• Chorus of the Oprichniki • Vladimir's Murder
13	Finale (Coda)	Finale (Ivan theme)

The performance duration is about 60 minutes.

== Recordings ==
=== Audio ===
Year	Conductor	Orchestra and choir	Soloists	Version
1965?	Abram Stasevich	Moscow State Philharmonic Orchestra, Moscow State Choir	Valentina Levko (mezzo-soprano), Anatoliy Mokrenko (baritone), Aleksandr Estrin (speaker)	Stasevich
1972	Maksim Shostakovich	London Philharmonic Orchestra, Yurlov Choral Kapella		Stasevich
1978	Riccardo Muti	Philharmonia Orchestra, Ambrosian Chorus	Irina Arkhipova (mezzo-soprano), Anatoliy Mokrenko (baritone), Boris Morgunov (speaker)	Stasevich
1979	Leonard Slatkin	Saint Louis Symphony Orchestra and Chorus	Claudine Carlson (mezzo-soprano), Samuel Timberlake (bass), Without speaker	Stasevich
1984	Alipi Naydenov	Russian Philharmonic Orchestra, Danube Sounds Choir	Vessela Zorova (mezzo-soprano), Dimiter Stanchev (bass), Boris Morgunov (speaker)	Stasevich
1991	Neeme Järvi	The Philharmonia Orchestra and Chorus	Linda Finnie (contralto), Nikita Storojev (bass-baritone)	Palmer
1993	Mstislav Rostropovich	London Symphony Orchestra and Chorus, The New London Children's Choir	Tamara Sinyavskaya (mezzo-soprano), Sergei Leiferkus (baritone), Christopher Plummer (narrator)	Lankester
1993	Vladimir Fedoseyev	Ostankino Television-Radio Symphony Orchestra, Yurlov Choral Kapella	Nina Romanova (mezzo-soprano), Grigory Gritsuk (bass), Boris Morgunov (speaker)	Stasevich
1995	Dmitriy Kitayenko	Radio-Sinfonie-Orchester Frankfurt, Danish National Radio Choir, Kinderchor Frankfurt	Tamara Sinyavskaya (mezzo-soprano), Wolfgang Brendel (baritone), Sergey Yursky (speaker)	Stasevich
1997	Valeriy Gergiev	Rotterdam Philharmonic Orchestra, Chorus of the Kirov Orchestra	Lyubov Sokolova (mezzo-soprano), Nikolay Putilin (baritone), Without speaker	Stasevich
2000	Vladimir Fedoseyev	Tchaikovsky Symphony Orchestra, Yurlov Choral Kapella, Children's Choir of Studio Vesna	Irina Chistyakova (contralto), Dmitry Stepanovich (bass)	Film score (manuscript)
2003	Valeriy Polyansky	State Symphonic Kapella of Russia, Russian State Symphonic Kapella	Lyudmila Kuznetsova (mezzo-soprano), Sergey Toptygin (baritone)	Film score (manuscript)
2004	Leonard Slatkin	BBC Symphony Orchestra and Chorus	Irina Chistyakova (mezzo-soprano), James Rutherford (bass-baritone), Simon Russell Beale (speaker)	Stasevich
2013	Tugan Sokhiev	Deutsches Symphonie-Orchester Berlin, Rundfunkchor Berlin, Staats- und Domchor Berlin	Olga Borodina (mezzo-soprano), Ildar Abdrazakov (bass)	Stasevich
2018	Frank Strobel	Rundfunk-Sinfonieorchester Berlin, Rundfunkchor, Berlin	Marina Prudenskaya (mezzo-soprano), Alexander Vinogradov (bass)	Film score (soundtrack)
2019	Heinrich Hänsler	Kammerorchester des Rheins & Chor	Gustavo Monastra (speaker)	free selection of different versions.

=== Video ===
Year	Conductor	Orchestra	Roles	Version
1976	Algis Zhuraitis	Bolshoi Theatre Orchestra	Yuri Vladimirov (Ivan), Natalia Bessmertnova (Anastasia), Boris Akimov (Kurbsky), Bolshoi Ballet	Chulaki
1990	Algis Zhuraitis	Bolshoi Theatre Orchestra	Irek Mukhamedov (Ivan), Natalya Bessmertnova (Anastasia), Gediminas Taranda (Kurbsky), Bolshoi Ballet	Chulaki
2003	Vello Pähn	Orchestre de l’Opéra de Paris	Nicolas Le Riche (Ivan), Eleonora Abbagnato (Anastasia), Karl Paquette (Kurbsky), Ballet de l'Opéra National de Paris	Chulaki
