= Danseur noble =

Male ballet dancer

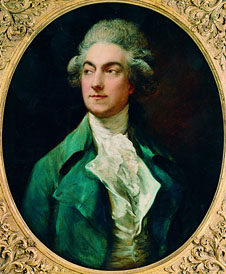
Gaétan Vestris, painted by Thomas Gainsborough

A danseur noble traditionally was a male ballet dancer who projected great nobility of character. Over the last century, the term has been used to define a male principal dancer who performs at the highest theatrical level combining grace with ability. Some use danseur noble as the masculine equivalent to a Prima Ballerina, or to refer to the male partner of a ballerina during a pas de deux.

== Notable examples ==
=== Historical and retired ===
- Gaétan Vestris
- Charles Le Picq
- Vaslav Nijinsky
- Léonide Massine
- Serge Lifar
- Adolph Bolm
- Mikhail Mordkin
- Anton Dolin
- Theodore Kosloff
- Pavel Gerdt
- Vakhtang Chabukiani
- Pyotr Gusev
- Asaf Messerer
- Roman Jasiński
- Igor Youskevitch
- Vasily Tikhomirov
- Aleksey Yermolayev
- Nikolai Fadeyechev
- Sergei Filin
- Askold Makarov
- Konstantin Sergeyev
- Erik Bruhn
- Rudolf Nureyev
- Edward Villella
- Jean-Pierre Bonnefoux
- Nicolas Le Riche
- Li Cunxin
- Carlos Acosta
- Jean Guizerix
- Vladimir Vasiliev
- Cyril Atanassoff
- Mikhail Baryshnikov
- Henning Kronstam
- Jacques d'Amboise
- Fernando Bujones
- Robert Helpmann
- Michael Somes
- Reid Anderson
- Anthony Dowell
- Wayne Eagling
- José Martinez
- Ivan Nagy
- Peter Martins
- Laurent Hilaire
- Julio Bocca
- Nikolay Tsiskaridze
- Manuel Legris
- Johan Kobborg
- Ethan Stiefel
- Maris Liepa
- Yuri Soloviev
- Alexander Godunov
- Irek Mukhamedov
- Farukh Ruzimatov
- Vladimir Malakhov

=== Current ===
- Roberto Bolle
- Mikhail Baryshnikov
- José Manuel Carreño
- David Hallberg
- Marcelo Gomes
- Vladimir Yaroshenko
- Federico Bonelli
- Sergei Polunin
- Thiago Soares
- Rupert Pennefather
- Igor Zelensky
- Mathieu Ganio
- Stéphane Bullion
- Evan McKie
- Matthew Golding
- Igor Kolb
- Leonid Sarafanov
- Vladimir Shklyarov
- Friedemann Vogel
- Vadim Muntagirov
