= Evan McKie =

Canadian ballet dancer and performer

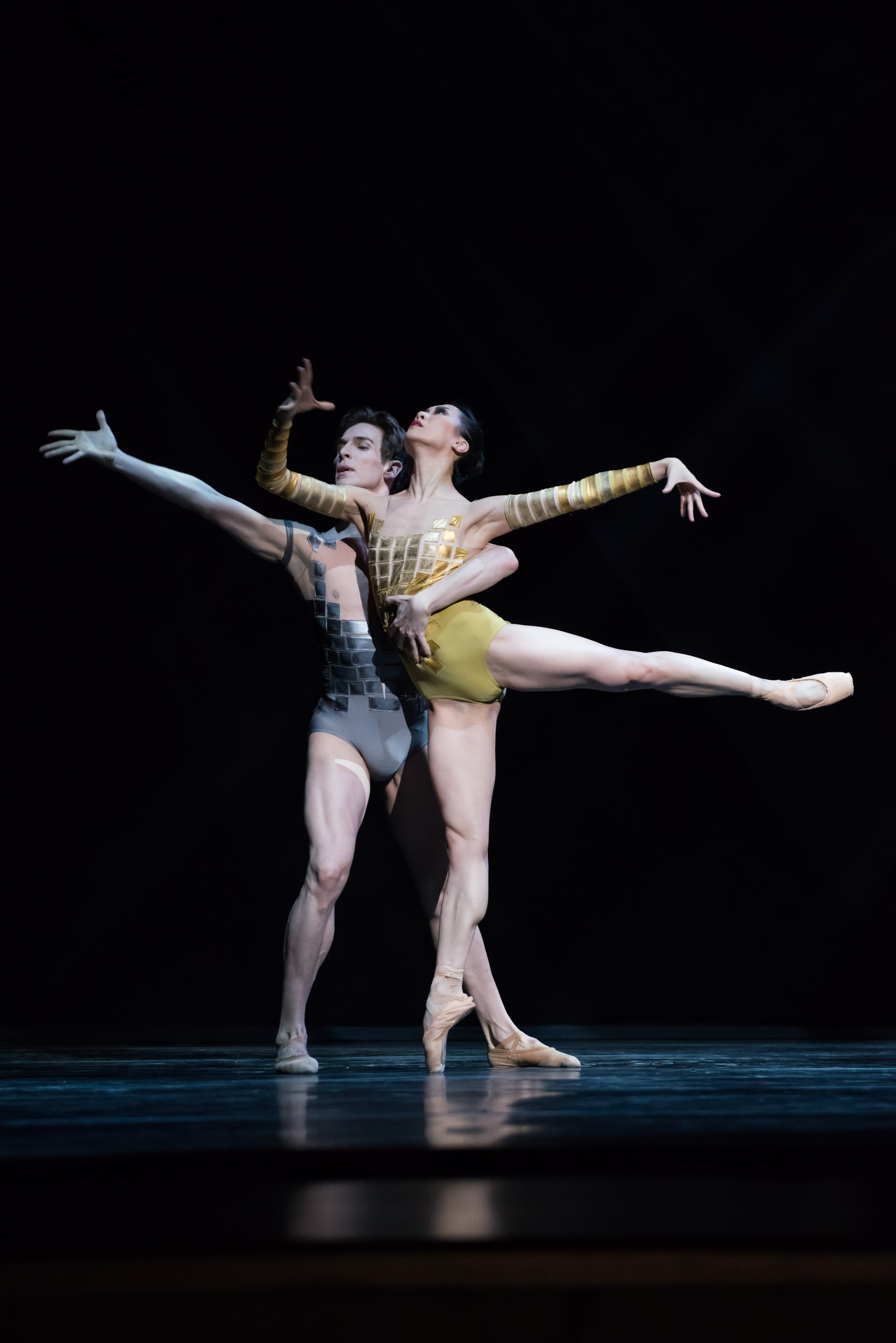
- McKie and Xiao Nan Yu
- Born: April 7, 1983 (age 41); Toronto, Canada
- Occupation(s): Ballet dancer, dance instructor, art instructor, movement director, writer, dance curator

Evan McKie is a ballet dancer in classical and contemporary ballet and an actor-dancer known for interpreting roles from literature, recognised as a danseur noble. He was principal dancer at Stuttgart Ballet from 2008 to 2014, and at the National Ballet of Canada from 2014 to 2022. He has served as an honorary advisor to Dance Collection Danse, and is a guest writer and a member of the international advisory board of Dance Magazine.

== Early life and education ==
McKie lived in Oakville, Ontario, from the age of 5, and began classes at Canada's National Ballet School aged 8. Aged 14, he began studying at the Kirov Academy of Ballet in Washington D.C. under the guidance of Vladimir Djouloukhadze. He was then invited to train under Pyotr Pestov at the Stuttgart Ballet affiliated John Cranko Schule, and joined Stuttgart Ballet in 2001.

== Career ==
McKie became a first soloist with Stuttgart Ballet in 2008. The Financial Times described his performance of Onegin as "the sensation of the entire season".

In Stuttgart, under the direction and mentorship of fellow Canadian Reid Anderson, McKie danced in classic ballets, narrative works, and contemporary collaborations. Anthony Dowell coached McKie in the British style in some of his own originated roles.

In 2014, McKie joined the National Ballet of Canada as Principal Dancer. McKie received critical acclaim while on tour and at home with the company. He was mentioned in Gary Smith's Top 10 performances of the year list in 2019 for his debut of George Balanchine's Apollo.

McKie did not give performances with the National Ballet from the beginning of Covid-19 in 2020. He left the company in July 2022.

McKie is a contributor and advisory board member for Dance Magazine.

=== Performance repertoire ===
Year	Ballet	Choreographer(s)	Role	Company
	Pastorale	James Kudelka	child	
1995	The Nutcracker	Celia Franca; James Kudelka	Naughty Boy	
2004	Hikarizatto	Itzik Galili		Stuttgart Ballet
2006, 2007	Onegin	John Cranko	Vladimir Lensky	Stuttgart Ballet
2008	Hamlet	Kevin O'Day	Laertes	Stuttgart Ballet
2012	The Sleeping Beauty	Rudolph Nureyev	Prince Florimund	National Ballet of Canada
	Giselle		Albrecht	National Ballet of Canada
2013	Initials RBME	John Cranko	soloist	Stuttgart Ballet
2013	Fanfare LX	Douglas Lee	pas de deux	Stuttgart Ballet
2014	Songs of a Wayfarer	Maurice Béjart	(pas de deux)	Stuttgart Ballet
2014	Swan Lake		Siegfried	National Ballet of Canada
2014	Onegin	John Cranko	Vladimir Lensky	National Ballet of Canada
2015	Chroma	Wayne McGregor		National Ballet of Canada
2015	Romeo and Juliet	Alexei Ratmansky	Tybalt	National Ballet of Canada
2015	The Winter's Tale	Christopher Wheeldon		National Ballet of Canada
2016	Onegin	John Cranko	Eugene Onegin	National Ballet of Canada
2016	Romeo and Juliet	Alexei Ratmansky	Romeo	National Ballet of Canada
2016	The Four Temperaments	George Balanchine	Phlegmatic	National Ballet of Canada
2017	A Streetcar Named Desire	John Neumeier	Mitch	National Ballet of Canada
2017	Nijinsky	John Neumeier	Diaghilev	National Ballet of Canada
2019	Apollo	George Balanchine	Apollo	National Ballet of Canada

== Awards ==
- McKie has several times received Italy's ApuliArte prize for achievement in dance.
- McKie was chosen as one of LaNotte Magazine's Top Five International Dancers of the Year for 2020 and 2021.
