= Claire Motte =

French ballerina, choreographer and dance teacher

Claire Motte (1937–1986) was a French ballerina, choreographer and dance teacher. After studying under Carlotta Zambelli at the company's school, she entered the Paris Opera Ballet when she was 14. Rising quickly through the ranks, she was named a danseuse étoile in December 1960. As a result of her outstanding technique, leading choreographers including George Balanchine and Serge Lifar sought to include her in their ballets. She was frequently a partner of Jean-Pierre Bonnefoux. In parallel, Motte taught dance and in 1977 was appointed professor at the Paris Opera and at the Conservatoire de Paris. Four years after she had left the stage, in 1983 Rudolf Nureyev appointed her ballet master for Swan Lake.

== Early life and education ==
Claire Motte was born in Belfort in eastern France on 21 December 1937. Her father was a colonel in the Paris fire department and her mother was a pianist. When she was ten, she was admitted to the Paris Opera Ballet School where she was a student of Carlotta Zamelli.

== Career ==
Motte enjoyed particularly rapid promotions at the Paris Opera Ballet after joining the company at age 14. When she was 23, she received the top grade of étoile. In 1957, she danced leading roles in the opera-ballet Les Indes galantes, in Lifar's Chemin de lumière and in La Symphonie fantastique and went on to excel in La Dame à la licorne and Swan Lake. In 1967, she created the role of Esmeralda in the premiere of Roland Petit's Notre-Dame de Paris. Her technique was so outstanding that the top choreographers of the period all sought to have her perform in their works. In addition to Lifar and Petit, these included George Balanchine, Michel Descombes and Maurice Béjart.

Other notable performances included On ne badine pas avec l'amour (Lifar, 1962), La Péri (George Skibine, 1966), Bacchus and Ariadne (Michel Descombey, 1967) and a new version of The Firebird (Béjart, 1975).

In parallel with her appearances, Motte taught dance at the Conservatoire de Bobigny (1969–79) and was head of dance at the Schola Cantorum de Paris (1969–75). From 1977, she taught at the Paris Opera Ballet School and at the Conservatoire de Paris.

Claire Motte died in Paris on 16 July 1986.
