= Irma Nioradze =

Georgian ballerina

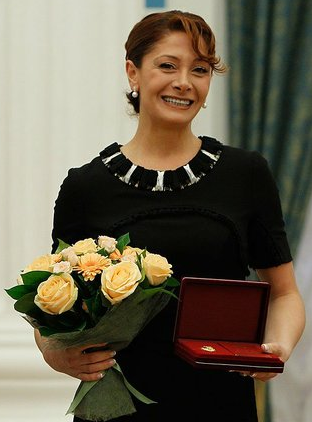
Irma Nioradze in 2011

Irma Nioradze (Georgian: ირმა ნიორაძე, Russian: Ирма Ниорадзе; born June 15, 1969, in Tbilisi, Georgia), is a Georgian ballerina and Principal Dancer of the Kirov-Mariinsky Ballet.

== Biography ==
Irma Nioradze was born in Tbilisi (Georgia). In 1987 Nioradze graduated from Tbilisi Choreographic School. She was taught by renowned teachers like Serafima Vekua and Vakhtang Chabukiani. In 1988 Nioradze became a lead ballet dancer of Tbilisi Opera and Ballet Theatre. Her repertoire included the leading parts in Giselle, Serenade and one-act ballets of G. Alksidze.

In 1990 Nioradze was the prize-winner of the International Ballet Competition in Jackson, Mississippi, USA. She was coached by Vladimir Djouloukhadze who also performed as her non-competitive partner. In 1991 Nioradze trained the Royal Danish Ballet in Copenhagen and participated in a production of Nina Ananiashvili and Her Friends. Since 1992, Nioradze has been a staple ballerina at Mariinsky Theatre Ballet Company.

Nioradze toured with the Mariinsky Ballet Company, she danced in Great Britain, USA, Holland, Japan, France, Italy, Spain, Denmark, Norway, Taiwan, Argentina, Brazil, Israel, Chile, Greece, Cyprus and Austria.

From the beginning of her career Irma Nioradze possesses the qualities necessary to become classical ballerina. There was much interest in her future while she was still a student of the Ballet Academy.

== Repertoire ==
- Sleeping Beauty: Lilac Fairy
- Swan Lake: Odette / Odile
- Le Corsaire: Medora
- La Bayadere: Nikiya / Gamzatti
- The Fountain of Bakhchisarai: Zarema
- Don Quixote: Kitri
- Giselle: Giselle
- Leading part in Paquita
- Scheherazade: Zobeide
- The Firebird: Firebird
- The Legend of Love: Mekhmeme-Banu
- Symphony in C: First movement
- Carmen: Carmen
- Le poéme de l'extase
- Le baiser de la fée: Fairy
- Jewels: Rubies
- Raymonda: Raymonda
- Manon: Manon
- Cinderella: Stepmother
- The Magic Nut: Temptress
- Romeo and Juliet: Juliet

== Awards ==
- Prizewinner of The International Ballet Competition (Jackson, 1991)
- Order of Honour (Georgia) (1996)
- Meritorious Artist of Russia (2002)
- Won the Baltika prize (2010)
- People's Artist of Russia (2011)

== See also ==
- List of Russian ballet dancers
