= Matthew Golding (dancer) =

Canadian ballet dancer

Matthew Golding (born 1985) is a Canadian ballet dancer and was a principal dancer with the Royal Ballet and a principal with the Dutch National Ballet (Het Nationale Ballet) in Amsterdam, The Netherlands.

== Early life ==
Golding was born in the Canadian province of Saskatchewan, where he started dancing at age eight.

== Career ==
He began his professional ballet training at 14, at the Royal Winnipeg Ballet School, then moved on to the Kirov Academy of Ballet in Washington DC, where he studied in the class of Vladimir Djouloukhadze on a full scholarship for two years. At 16, Golding received the Prix de Lausanne, which gave him the opportunity to study at The Royal Ballet School in London, where he graduated with honors. Golding also won the Youth America Grand Prix in New York in 2002.

Golding joined American Ballet Theatre's Studio Company in September 2003 and the main company as an apprentice in April 2004.

He joined the Royal Ballet as a Principal Dancer in February 2014 but left the company in 2017. Since then, Golding has been a guest artist with the Hong Kong Ballet playing Conrad in Le Corsaire.
