= Notre-Dame de Paris (ballet) =

1967 ballet by Roland Petit

Notre-Dame de Paris is a ballet by French choreographer Roland Petit. It was premiered by the Paris Opera Ballet in 1967. The ballet is based on Victor Hugo's 1831 novel The Hunchback of Notre-Dame.

It was the first work Petit created for the Paris Opera Ballet, which he had left 20 years earlier.

This ballet was very successful and continues to be performed to the present, including a series of performances at the Opéra national de Paris at the end of the 2013–2014 season, at the Opera Bastille and a production in 2013 at the Teatro alla Scala in Milan.

Music
Maurice Jarre
Libretto
after Victor Hugo
Sets
René Allio
Costumes
Yves Saint Laurent

Original cast
Esmeralda: Claire Motte
Quasimodo: Roland Petit
Frollo: Cyril Atanassoff
Phoebus: Jean-Pierre Bonnefous
