= Yuri Vladimirov =

Russian ballet dancer (1942–2025)

- Юрий Владимиров
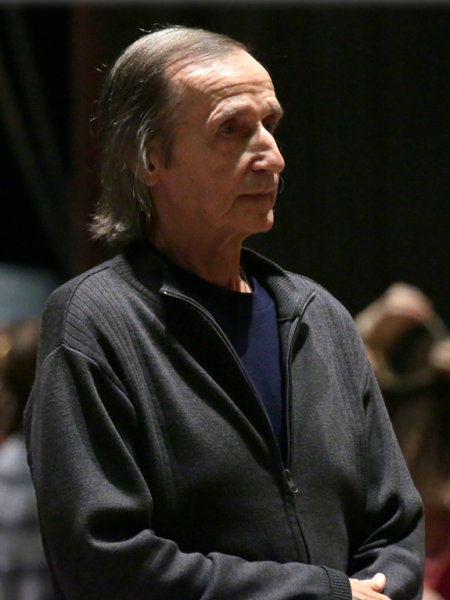
- Vladimirov in 2017
- Born: 1 January 1942; Kosteryovo, Petushinsky District, Moscow Oblast, Russian SFSR, Soviet Union
- Died: 19 May 2025 (aged 83)
- Education: Moscow State Academy of Choreography
- Occupations: Ballet dancer; ballet trainer
- Employer: Bolshoi Theatre
- Awards: Order of the Badge of Honour; Honoured Artist of RSFSR; People's Artist of the USSR

Yuri Kuzmich Vladimirov (Russian: Юрий Кузьмич Владимиров; 1 January 1942 – 19 May 2025) was a Russian Bolshoi Ballet dancer. He became one of the troupe's leading soloists, often dancing with his wife Nina Sorokina. They achieved prizes at international competitions. He portrayed various title roles such as Sergei Slonimsky's Icarus, Richard Strauss's Don Quixote and especially Ivan the Terrible in 1975, which was created for him by choreographer Yury Grigorovich to music by Prokofiev, shown on tour at the Metropolitan Opera and filmed. Vladimirov was regarded as "the wild card" of the Bolshoi, for daring leaps and psychological portrayal of complex characters. He was honoured as Merited Artist of the Russian Federation in 1970, as People's Artist of the USSR in 1975, and received the Order of Honour in 1976.

== Life and career ==
Vladimirov was born in the town of Kosteryovo, in Vladimir Oblast, on 1 January 1942. In 1962, he graduated from the Moscow State Academy of Choreography where Aleksey Yermolayev was his teacher. He became a member of Bolshoi Ballet soon after and was married to the Bolshoi ballerina Nina Sorokina.

=== Bolshoi Ballet ===
Vladimirov became one of the troupe's leading soloists, known for daring bravura. He performed in the world premiere of Nikolai Karetnikov's Geologists in 1964, choreographed by Natalia Kasatkina and Vladimir Vasiliev. He appeared as Philip in Boris Asafyev's The Flame of Paris. With his wife, he danced in lead roles in a new production of Stravinsky's Le Sacre du printemps in 1965, choreographed again by Kasatkina and Vasiliev. In 1965 he appeared as the Blue Bird in Tchaikovsky's The Sleeping Beauty in the choreography of Marius Petipa, revised by Yury Grigorovich. He performed as Baitemir in Vladimir Vlasov's Aseli, choreographed by O. Vinogradov, in 1967. The same year he portrayed the Prince in Tchaikovsky's The Nutcracker in the Petipa choreography revised by Grigorovich. He danced the title roles of Khachaturian's Spartacus, choreographed by Grigorovich in 1969, and of Sergei Slonimsky's Icarus, choreographed by Vasilyev in 1971. A reviewer of an excerpt from Spartacus in Los Angeles in 1993 noted that the dancer, regarded as "the wild card" of the Bolshoi, still looked "gloriously unpredictable and anti-classical—still an icon of rough individuality, the fighter and rebel extraordinaire".

Vladimirov appeared as the Station Man in Rodion Shchedrin's Anna Karenina, choreographed by Maya Plisetskaya among others in 1972. He became known for portraying Ivan the Terrible in ballet od the same name, choreographed by Grigorovich in 1975 with a stage set by Simon Virsaladze. The full-length piece was created for Vladimirov, to music by Prokofiev, mainly from his film score for Eisenstein's 1945 Ivan the Terrible and its sequel. The performance was also shown at the Metropolitan Opera in New York City, regarded as sensational.

Vladimirov performed as Benedict in Tikhon Khrennikov's Love for Love, choreographed by Grigorovich in 1975. He danced Rzhevsky in Khrennikov's Hussar Ballad, choreographed by D. Bryantsev in 1980. In 1985 he portrayed the title role Richard Strauss's Don Quixote in the choreography of A. Petrov.

Vladimirov remained with the company as a dancer until 1987, and was then a master rehearser there from 1987 to 2025. His students include Dmitry Gudanov, Ivan Vasilyev and Sergei Dorensky, among others.

=== Films ===
Vladimirov performed in 1970 in Shchedrin's television ballet Naughty Ditties, choreographed by N. Ryzhenko, and in 1973 both in a television program Choreographic Novellas in choreography by Kasatkina and Vasilyev, and in the film-ballet Ivan the Terrible. A reviewer of Ivan the Terrible noted that it "reveals a complex and multifaceted psychological image of Ivan the Terrible. He performs in the play as a statesman, as a hero, as a terrible, cruel punisher, and as a man capable of deep and pure feelings", portrayed with "psychological facets, complexities and contradictions".

=== Competitions and awards ===
Vladimirov was a winner of the Varna International Ballet Competition in 1966, of the International Dance Festival in Paris in 1969, of the All-Union Competition of New Choreographic Numbers in Moscow in 1969. He shared a gold star for best ballet pair at the International dance festival in Paris with his wife.

In 1970, he received the Merited Artist of the Soviet Union award for Icarus. He received the People's Artist of the USSR award in 1975. His portrayal of Benedict in Love for Love earned him the Order of Honour in 1976.

=== Personal life ===
Vladimirov was married to the Bolshoi ballerina Nina Sorokina with whom he often appeared and won competitions. She died in 2011.

Vladimirov died on 19 May 2025, at the age of 83, on the same day as one of his fellow ballet dancers and collaborators, Yury Grigorovich.
