= Ivan the Terrible (ballet) =

Russian 1975 ballet

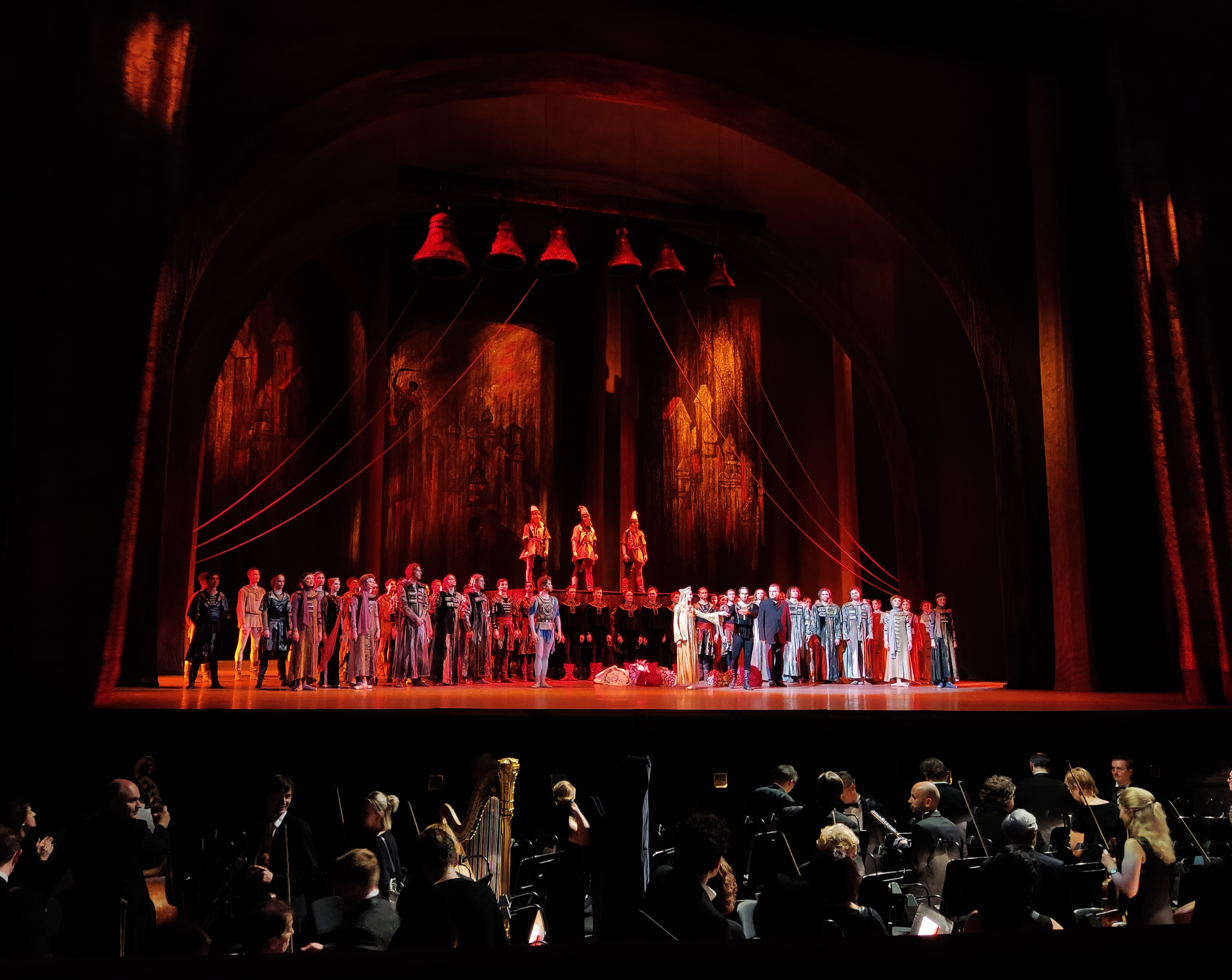
- Scene from a 2022 Bolshoi production
- Native title: Иван Грозный
- Choreographer: Yury Grigorovich
- Music: Sergei Prokofiev
- Based on: life of Ivan the Terrible
- Premiere: 1975; Bolshoi Theatre; Moscow
- Original ballet company: Bolshoi Ballet
- Design: Simon Virsaladze

Ivan the Terrible (Russian: Иван Грозный) is a full-length ballet choreographed by Yury Grigorovich for the Bolshoi Ballet in Moscow, where it was first performed in 1975 with scenic design and costumes by Simon Virsaladze. It was based on music by Sergei Prokofiev, namely his film score for Eisenstein's 1945 Ivan the Terrible and its sequel. Yuri Vladimirov created the title role. The ballet was presented on international tours and was filmed in 1976. The production has remained in the repertoire of the Bolshoi.

== Ballet ==
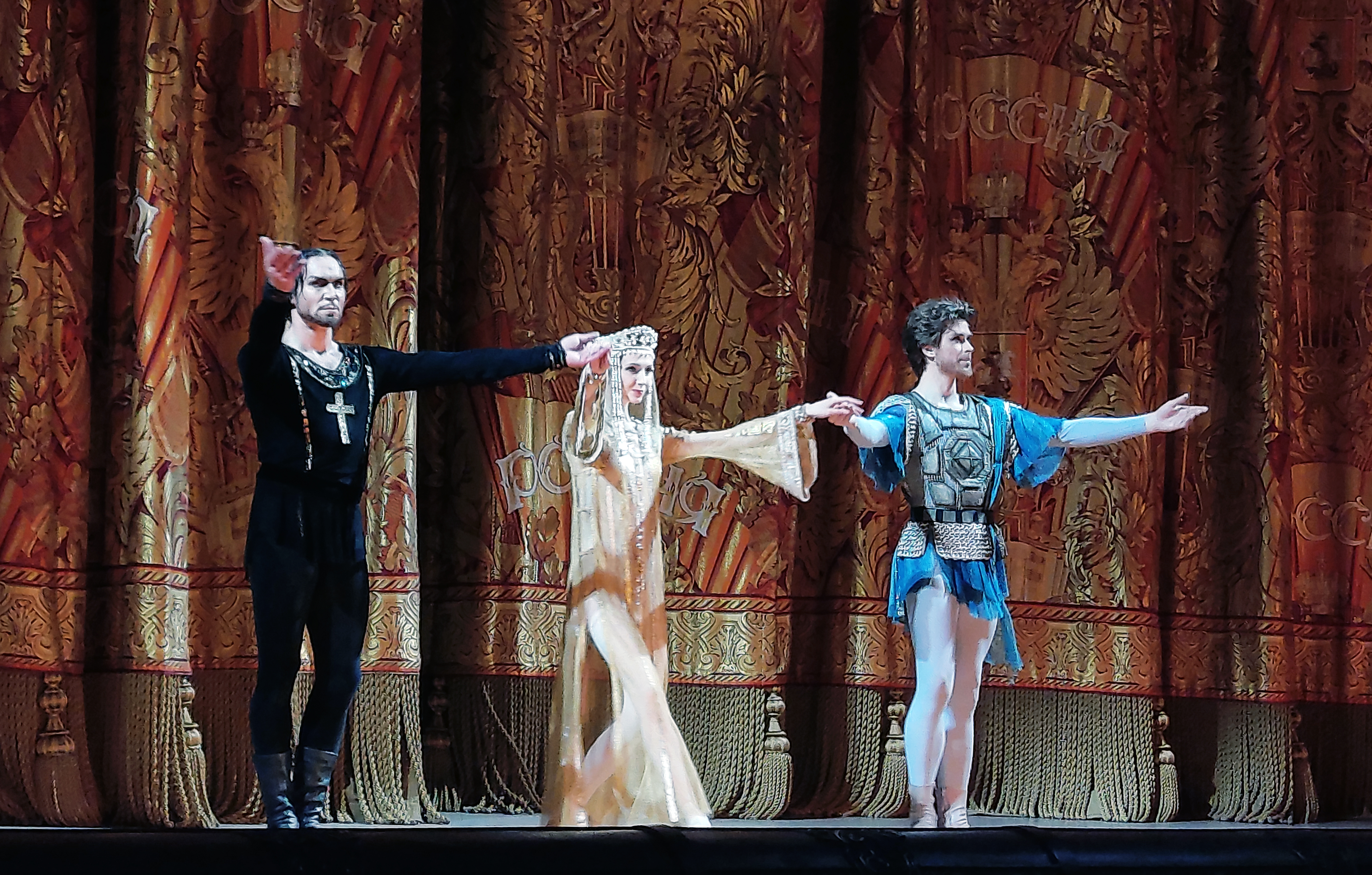
Curtain call after a 2022 Bolshoi performance

Ivan the Terrible was created in 1975 as a full-length ballet of the Bolshoi Ballet in Moscow by its artistic director and choreographer Yury Grigorovich, for Yuri Vladimirov in the title role, Tsar Ivan the Terrible. The leading soloist was regarded as "the wild card" of the Bolshoi, for his daring leaps and psychological portrayal of complex characters. The scenery and the costumes were designed by Grigorovich's frequent collaborator, Simon Virsaladze.

The music was taken from several compositions of Sergei Prokofiev, who had written a film score on the subject for a 1945 film and its sequel. Mikhail Chulaki arranged the music, including also excerpts from Prokofiev's Symphony No. 3, Russian Overture, and Alexander Nevsky. Grigorovich was driven primarily by the music, not by historic facts from Ivan's life.

In 16 scenes, the ballet shows events in Ivan's life, ascending the throne, facing resentment of the Boyars, marrying Anastasia, defeating an invasion and celebrating victory, followed by the Boyars plotting against him and poisoning the Tsarina, to which he responds with a massacre of revenge, but then ends not only in grief but seeming madness.

In the premiere production, Vladimirov danced the title role, alongside Natalia Bessmertnova as Anastasia and Boris Akimov as Kurbsky, a Boyar leader. The ballet was presented on international tours, including at the Metropolitan Opera in New York City, where it was regarded as sensational. The title role was performed by several other dancers.

=== Film ===
A film-ballet The Terrible Age (Russian: Грозный век) based on the original staging was produced in 1976, and used various special effects to enhance the ballet. The film abbreviated various parts of the 2-hour ballet to 90 minutes.

Another film-ballet Ivan the Terrible, was produced in 1986. A reviewer noted that it "reveals a complex and multifaceted psychological image of Ivan the Terrible, as a statesman, a hero, a terrible, cruel punisher, and as a man capable of deep and pure feelings", portrayed with "psychological facets, complexities and contradictions".
