= Ryzhenkov =

Ryzhenkov (masculine, Russian: Рыженков) or Ryzhenkova (feminine, Russian: Рыженкова) is a Russian surname. Notable people with the surname include:

- Oleg Ryzhenkov (born 1967), Belarusian biathlete
- Oleksandr Ryzhenkov (born 1950), Ukrainian metallurgist and economist
- Viktor Ryzhenkov (born 1966), Uzbekistani pole vaulter
- Vladimir Ryzhenkov (1948–2011), Russian weightlifter
