= Yury Grigorovich =

Soviet and Russian dancer and choreographer (1927–2025)

- Юрий Григорович
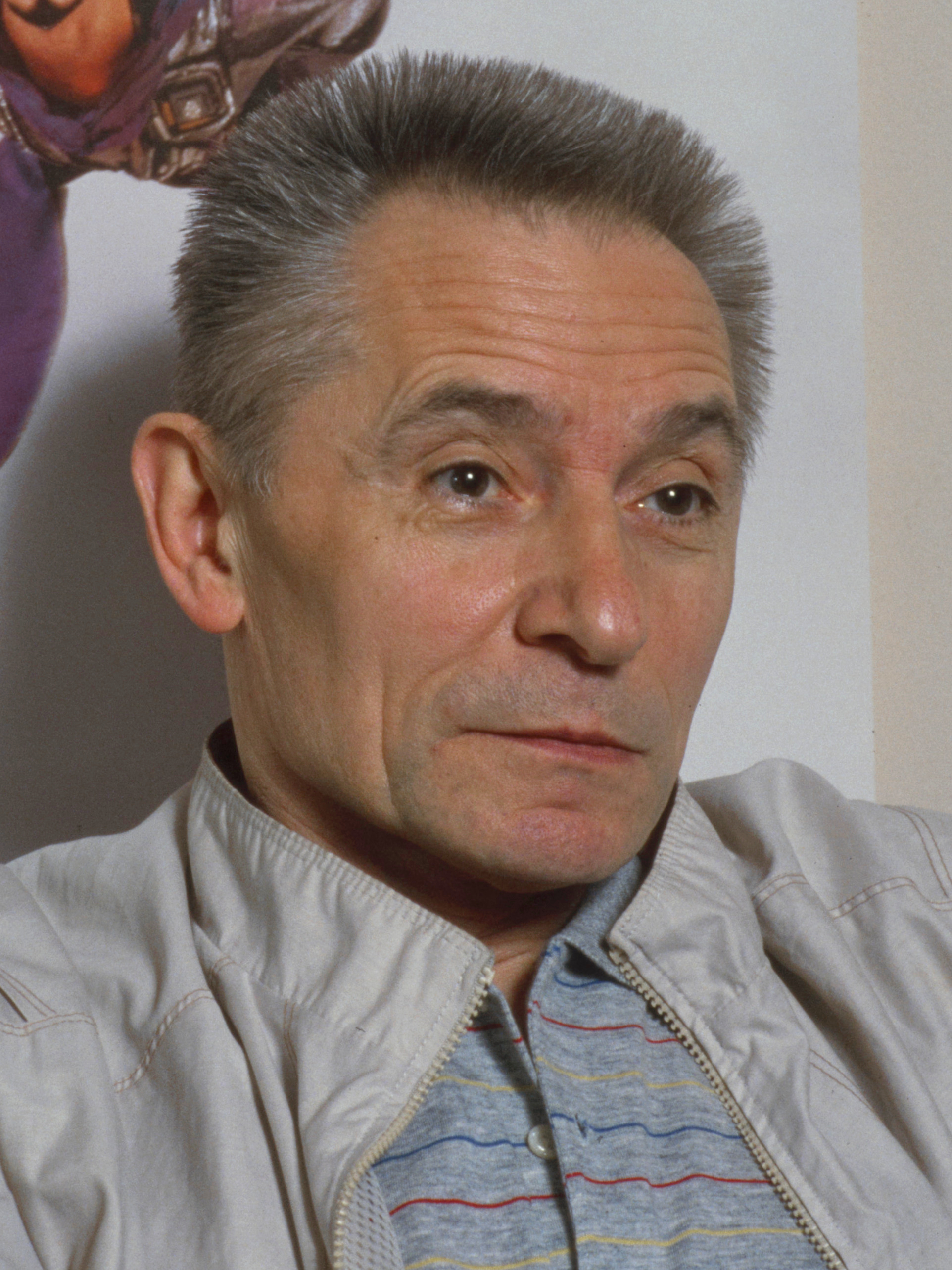
- Grigorovich in 1979
- Born: 2 January 1927; Leningrad, Russian SFSR, Soviet Union
- Died: 19 May 2025 (aged 98); Moscow, Russia
- Education: Leningrad Choreographic School
- Occupations: Ballet dancer; choreographer; ballet director; pedagogue

Yury Nikolayevich Grigorovich (Russian: Юрий Николаевич Григорович; 2 January 1927 – 19 May 2025) was a Soviet and Russian ballet dancer, ballet master, choreographer, and pedagogue who dominated the Russian ballet for 30 years, especially as artistic director of the Bolshoi Ballet from 1964 to 1995. His choreographies of The Stone Flower, Ivan the Terrible and Romeo and Juliet are said to have "redefined Soviet ballet".

== Biography ==
Grigorovich was born in Leningrad on 2 January 1927 to a family connected with the Imperial Russian Ballet; his uncle Georgy Rozai had been a pupil of Vaslav Nijinsky and dancer with the Mariinsky Theatre and the Ballet Russes. He graduated from the Leningrad Choreographic School in 1946 and danced as a soloist of the Kirov Ballet until 1962. He choreographed Prokofiev's The Stone Flower in 1957, which became a breakthrough. In the piece based on fairy tales from the Ural Mountains, he made classical pointe dancing a means of expression. The production involved a new generation of dancers who became stars. He choreographed Arif Melikov's The Legend of Love in 1961, based on a Persian tale; with scenic designer Simon Virsaladze, he interspersed monologues of characters with ensemble pieces. Grigorovich became artistic director of the Kirov in 1962.

In 1964 Grigorovich moved to the Bolshoi Theatre in Moscow, where he would work as chief choreographer until 1988, then artistic director until 1995. He created eight new ballets, often with Virsaladze as scenic designer, and versions of classical ballets, the basis of the Bolshoi repertoire. His most famous productions there were full-length narrative ballets: Tchaikovsky's The Nutcracker in 1966, Khachaturian's Spartacus in 1967, and Ivan the Terrible in 1975. His choreography of The Nutcracker was performed at the Vienna State Opera 125 times between 1973 and 1997. His Spartacus choreography was presented at the Royal Opera House in London in 2019, regarded as the Bolshoi's calling card.

Grigorovich choreographed Prokofiev's Romeo and Juliet in 1979, and Shostakovich's The Golden Age. In 1980 he choreographed the opening ceremony of the 1980 Summer Olympics in Moscow. He controversially reworked Swan Lake to produce a happy end for the story in 1984. In 1995, he was accused of having allowed the theatre to plunge into stagnation and after many a squabble was ousted from office.

Grigorovich then choreographed for various Russian companies before settling in Krasnodar, where he set up his own company in 1996. Grigorovich headed the juries of numerous international competitions in classical ballet, including the Prix Benois de la Danse He was offered the opportunity to return to the Bolshoi in the capacity of ballet master and choreographer in 2008.

=== Personal life ===
Grigorovich's first wife was ballerina Alla Shelest, who danced in the Kirov Theatre pieces that he choreographed, The Stone Flower, and The Legend of Love. They separated when he moved to Moscow in 1964; she stayed in Leningrad, and married choreographer Rafail Vagabov.

In Moscow, Grigorovich met ballerina Natalia Bessmertnova, who danced the main roles in the ballets he choreographed. She was married (to an engineer, in 1963) but they began an affair in 1966. Bessmertnova divorced her husband and married Grigorovich in 1968. They stayed together until her death in 2008.

On 19 May 2025, Grigorovich died in Moscow at the age of 98, on the same day as one of his fellow ballet dancers and collaborators, Yuri Vladimirov.

== Awards and honours ==
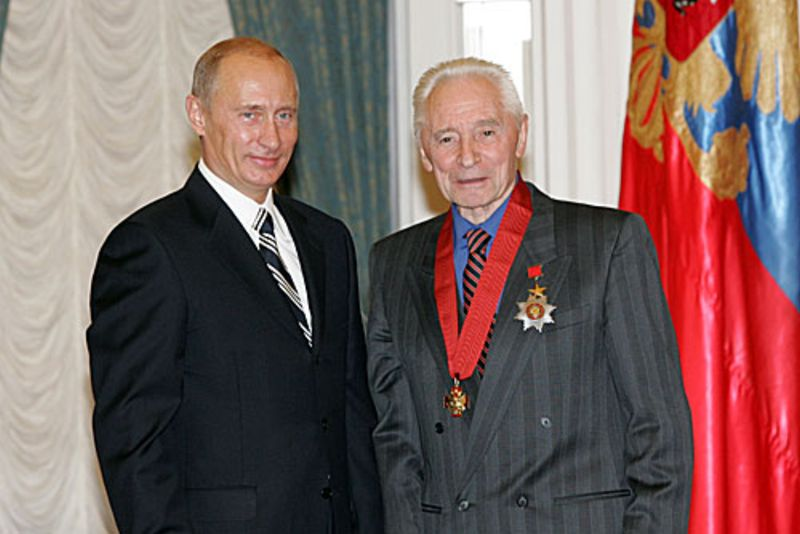
Presentation of the Order "For Merit to the Fatherland", 2nd class (9 October 2007)

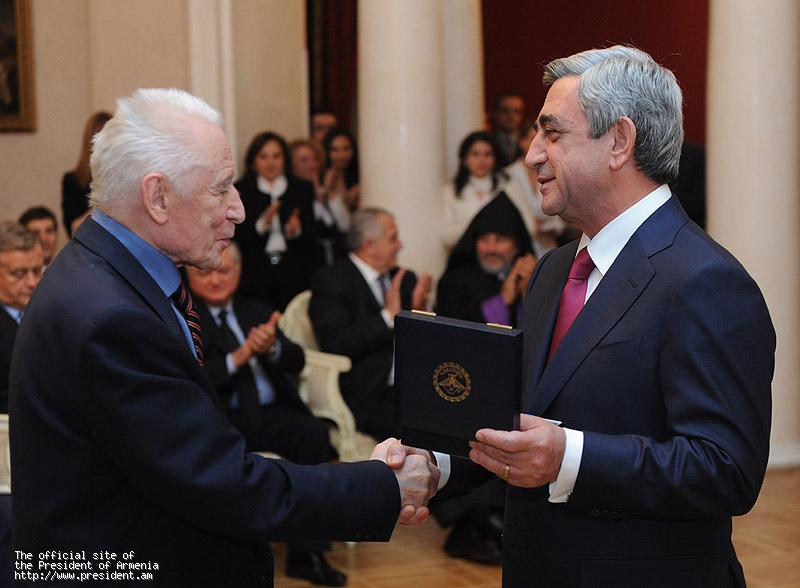
Presentation of the Armenian Order of Honour with Serzh Sargsyan (October 23, 2011)

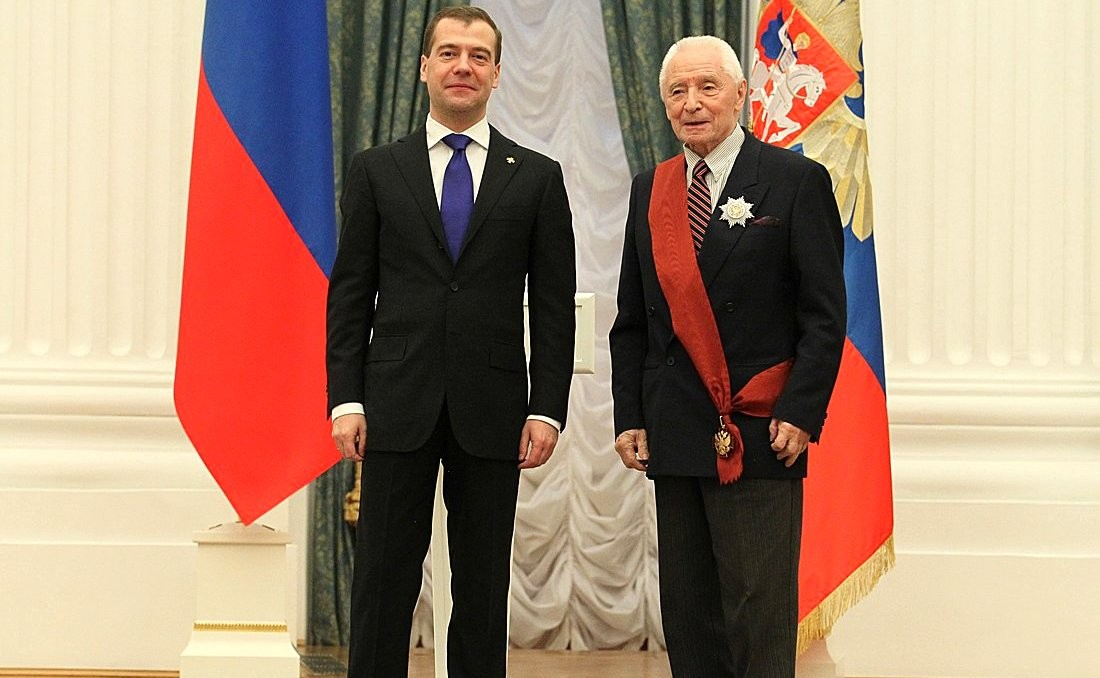
Presentation of the Order "For Merit to the Fatherland", 1st class (29 December 2011)

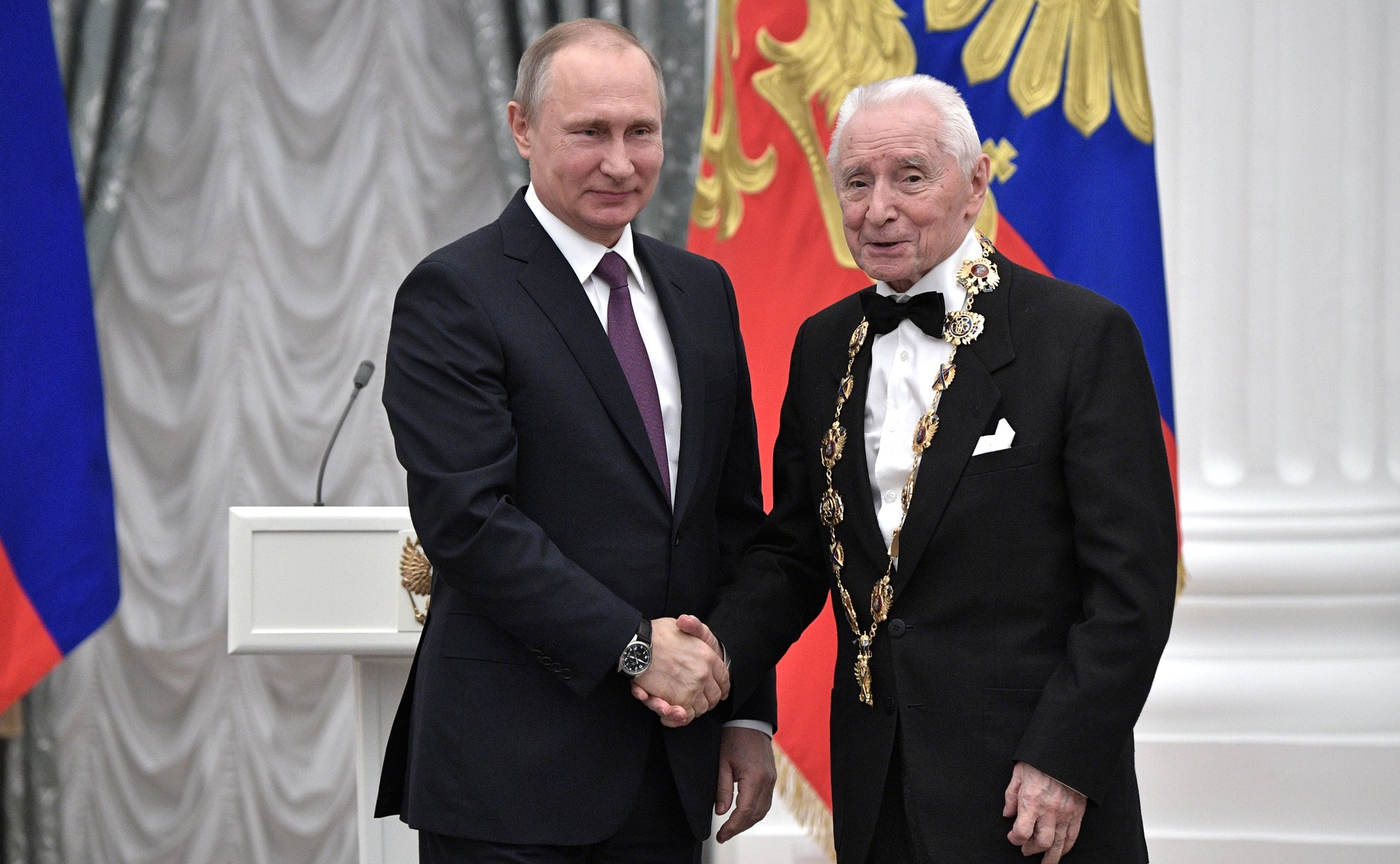
Presentation of the Order of St. Andrew (24 May 2017)

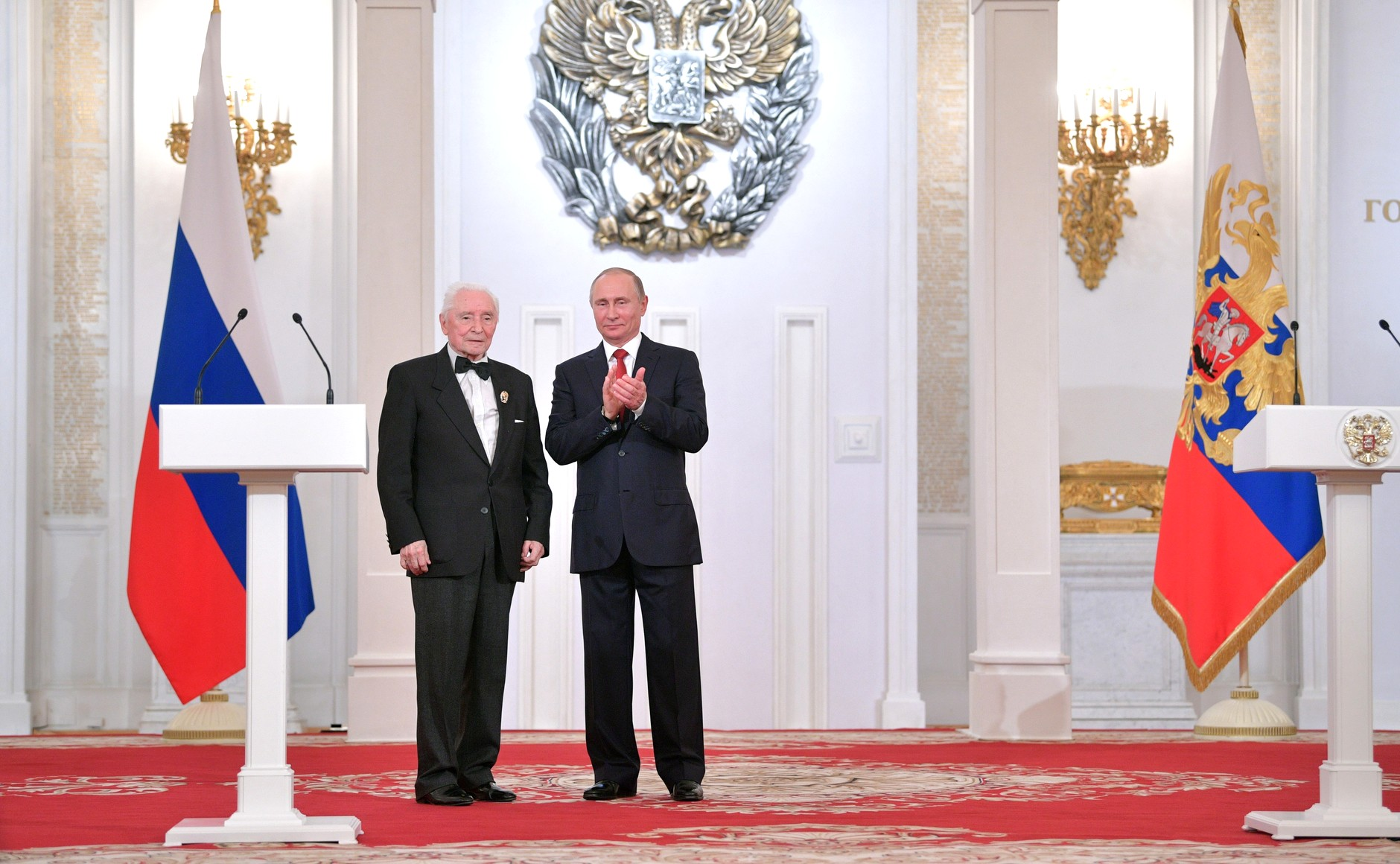
Presentation of the State Prize of the Russian Federation (12 June 2017)

- People's Artist of the RSFSR (1966)
- People's Artist of the USSR (1973)
- Two Orders of Lenin (1976, 1986)
- Two USSR State Prizes (1977, 1985)
- Order of the October Revolution (1981)
- State Hamza Prize (1983)
- Hero of Socialist Labour (1986)
- Order "For Merit to the Fatherland", 3rd class (2002) for outstanding contribution to the development of choreographic art
- Order "For Merit to the Fatherland", 2nd class (2007) for outstanding contribution to the development of domestic and international choreographic art, many years of creative activity
- Order "For Merit to the Fatherland", 1st class (2011)
- Order of St. Andrew (2017)
- State Prize of the Russian Federation (2017)
