= Nina Sorokina =

Russian ballet dancer (1942–2011)

- Нина Сорокина
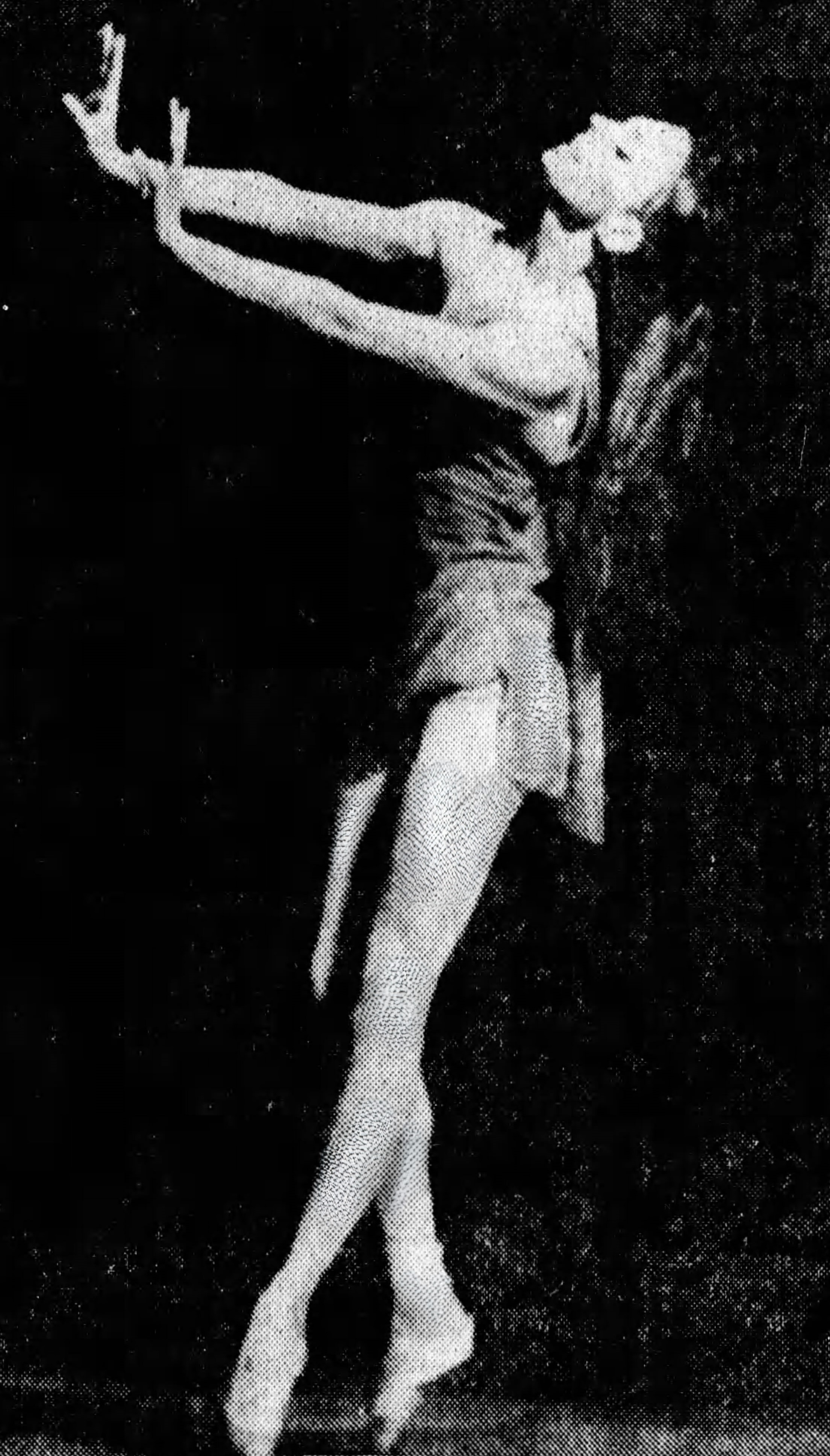
- Sorokina as Phrygia in Spartacus, 1975
- Born: 13 May 1942; Elektrostal, USSR
- Died: 8 October 2011 (aged 69); Moscow, Russia
- Occupation: Ballet dancer
- Employer: Bolshoi Theatre
- Awards: People's Artist of the USSR

Nina Sorokina (Russian: Нина Ивановна Сорокина; 13 May 1942 – 8 October 2011) was a Russian principal dancer of the Bolshoi Ballet and a 1987 People's Artist of the USSR recipient.

== Biography ==
Sorokina was born on 13 May 1942 in Elektrostal. She studied in the Moscow State Academy of Choreography (the Bolshoi Ballet academy) under the guidance of Sofia Golovkina. She became a soloist of the Bolshoi Theatre by 1961, where she was coached by Marina Semyonova.

During her career she played in ballets such as Icarus, Asel and Cheeky Rhymes. She danced the title roles of Giselle and The Sleeping Beauty, and appeared as Kitri in Don Quixote. Her partners on stage included Mikhail Lavronsky and Māris Liepa, but her most prominent partner was her husband, Yuri Vladimirov. They appeared in lead roles in a new production of Stravinsky's Le Sacre du printemps in 1965, choreographed by Natalia Kasatkina and Vladimir Vasiliev. With a pas de deux from Esmeralda, the couple achieved the gold medal at the first International Ballet Competition in Moscow in 1969, when Mikhail Baryshnikov won as soloist.

In 1966 she received her first gold medal at the International Ballet Competition in Varna. She won first prize at the 1969 Moscow International Ballet Competition, and shared a gold star for best ballet pair at the International dance festival in Paris with Yuri Vladimirov. In 1970 she was awarded Honored Artist of the RSFSR, and in 1975 People's Artist of the RSFSR. In 1976 she was awarded the Order of the Badge of Honour, and in 1987, People's Artist of the USSR.

Sorokina died after a long illness in Moscow on 8 October 2011, at the age of 69.
