= Michel Descombey =

French ballet dancer and director

- Born: 28 October 1930; Bois-Colombes, France
- Died: 5 December 2011 (aged 81); Mexico City, Mexico

Michel Descombey (28 October 1930 – 5 December 2011) was a French ballet dancer, choreographer and director.

== Career ==
Descombay studied dancing in Paris, and debuted as a professional dancer of the Ballet de l'Opéra National in 1947. In 1959 he became premier danseur, then ballet master, and official choreographer and finally director of the company from 1962 to 1969. He also established the training ballet group of the Opéra National de Paris. Afterwards he was ballet director of the Zürcher Ballett of the Zurich Opera from 1971 to 1973, and was invited to Mexico by Orozco. In 1975 he settled down in Mexico, where he became chief choreographer and associate director of the Ballet Teatro del Espacio in 1977. He was a member of the Sistema Nacional de Creadores de Arte (SNCA).

== Honors ==
- Chevalier (knight) of the Ordre des Arts et des Lettres
- Chevaliers of the Légion d'honneur
- Order of the Aztec Eagle
