= Ballet dancer =

Person who practices the art of ballet

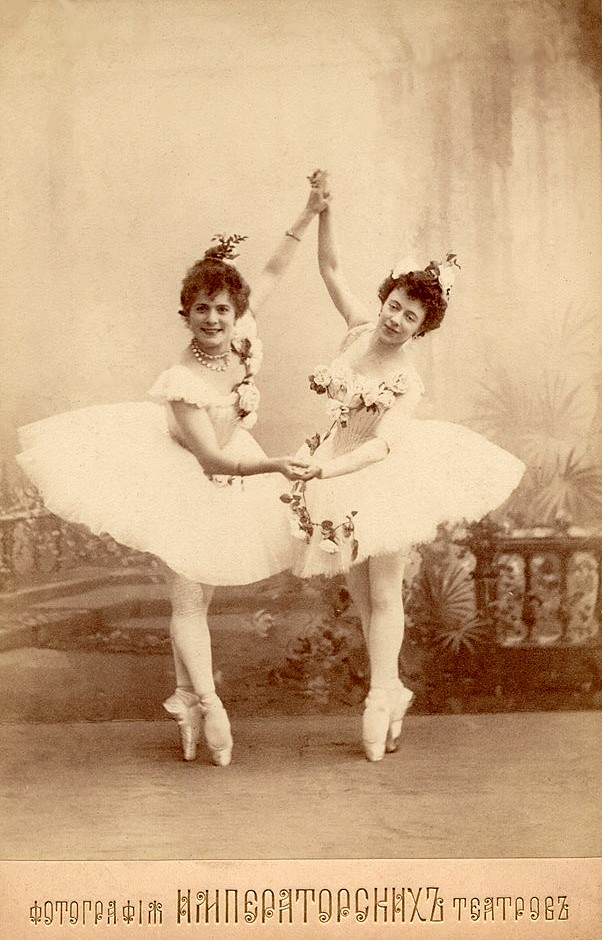
Pierina Legnani (left) as Medora and Olga Preobrajenska (right) as Gulnare in the scene Le jardin animé from Marius Petipa's final revival of Le Corsaire, St. Petersburg, 1899. Legnani was named première danseuse assoluta of the Teatro alla Scala in Milan, and would later be named prima ballerina assoluta of the St. Petersburg Imperial Theatres. Preobrajenska became prima ballerina of the St. Petersburg Imperial Theatres and went on to become one of the most influential teachers in the history of classical ballet.

A ballet dancer is a person who practices the art of classical ballet. Both women and men can practice ballet. They rely on years of extensive training and proper technique to become a part of a professional ballet company. Ballet dancers are at a high risk of injury due to the demanding technique of ballet dancing.

== Training and technique ==
Classical ballet dancers engage in rigorous, multi-year training designed to develop extreme flexibility, muscular strength, and motor control. Professional training typically begins between the ages of seven and ten. Early instruction focuses on establishing proper placement and turnout. These skills are fundamental to the aesthetic and functional requirements of ballet dancing, allowing for greater range of motion and the iconic lateral movements of the legs.

=== Pedagogical methods ===
Training is generally categorized into specific systems or schools, the most prominent being the Vaganova method (Russian), the Cecchetti method (Italian), the Royal Academy of Dance (British), and the Balanchine method (American). These methods differ in style and tempo.

=== Structure of a ballet class ===
Regardless of the method, standard ballet classes are typically divided into three main segments:

Barre: Dancers use a wooden rail for support while performing exercises like pliés, and grand battement to warm up the muscles and establish balance.

Centre: Exercises are performed without support, incorporating adagio (slow, controlled movements), allegro (jumps and brisk footwork), and tours (turns).

Floor: Combinations preformed across or diagonally, incorporating leaps, turns, and jumps, going from one side of the room to the other.

=== Specialized techniques ===
Female dancers eventually progress to pointe work, which involves dancing on the tips of the toes using reinforced pointe shoes. This transition typically occurs around age 12, once the bones of the feet have sufficiently developed and the dancer has gained enough ankle strength. Male dancers focus on virtuosity, emphasizing grand allegro (high-elevation jumps) and complex multiple turns, as well as pas de deux (partnering) skills to support and lift female dancers.

== Injuries ==
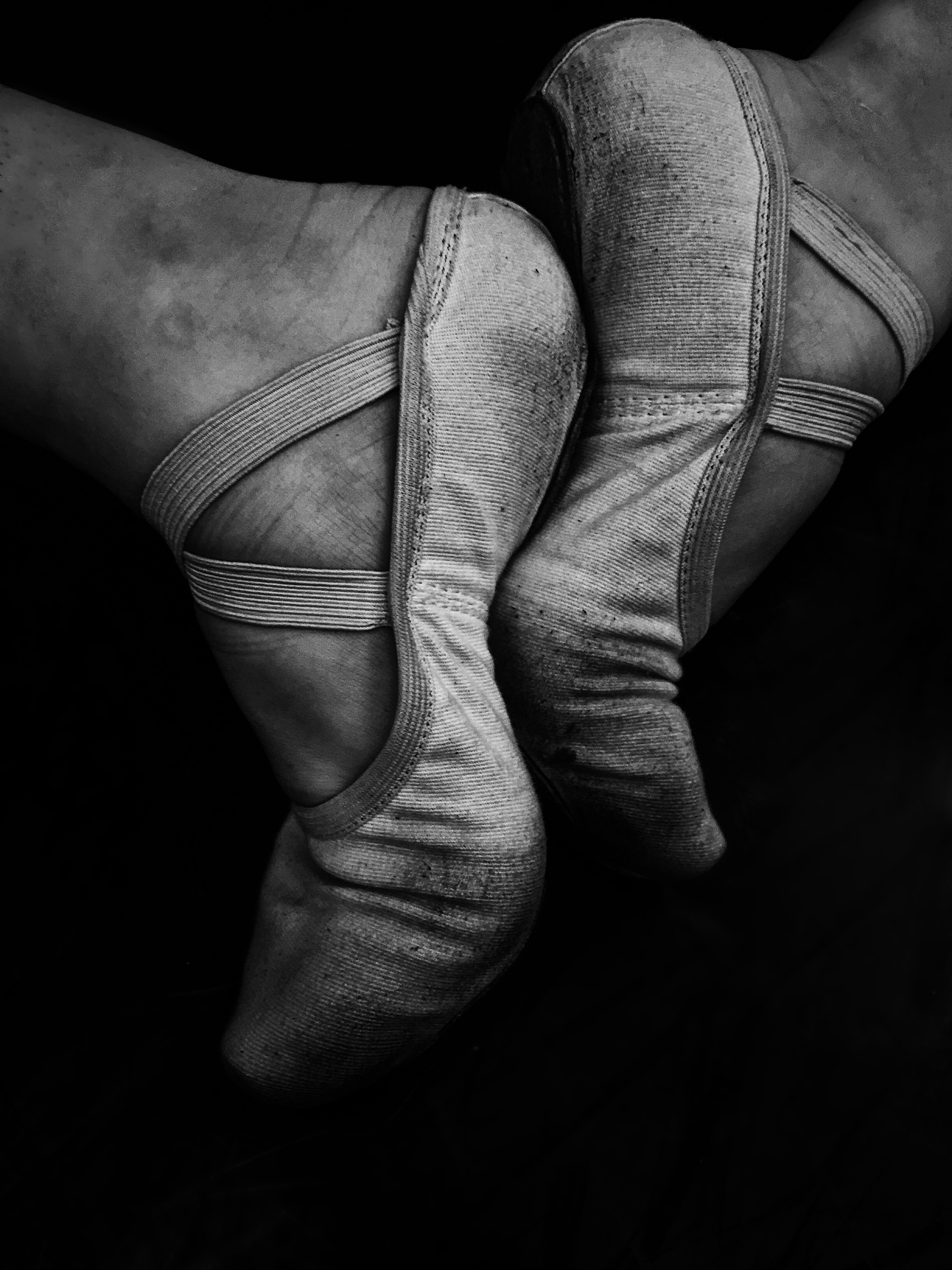
Many ballet dancers end up with injured feet due to the size of the shoes or the use of their feet in choreography

Ballet dancers are susceptible to injury because they are constantly putting strain and stress on their bodies and their feet. A ballet dancer's goal is to make physically demanding choreography appear effortless. The five standard ballet positions emphasize and demand maximum external and internal rotation. Dance instruction and training often begin as young as three years of age, where these extremes of motion can lead to adaptive changes to the acetabulum, proximal femur, and surrounding soft tissues over time. These changes to how the soft tissue forms can subsequently lead to microinstability of the hip.

The upper body of a ballet dancer is prone to injury because choreography and class exercises require them to exert energy into contorting their backs and hips. Backbends cause the back to pinch, making the spine vulnerable to injuries such as spasms and pinched nerves. Extending the legs and holding them in the air while turned out causes damage to the hips. Such damage includes strains, fatigue fractures, and bone density loss.

Injuries are common in ballet dancers because ballet consists of putting the body in unnatural positions. One such position is first position, in which the heels are placed together as the toes point outward, rotating, or "turning out" the legs. If First Position is done incorrectly it can cause knee problems; however, when done correctly (turning out with the hips rather than the knees) it should increase flexibility and reduce pressure on the knees. Meniscal tears and dislocations can happen at the knees when positioned incorrectly because it is easy to let the knees slide forward while turned out in first position.

The hip is particularly at risk, where hyperflexion, excessive external rotation, and hyperabduction are required for many dance positions. Common conditions that many dancers struggles to manage including femoroacetabular impingement (FAI), labral tears, external and internal snapping hip syndrome, and microinstability. However, there is new techonology and methods to studying and identifying these issues in ballet dancer, unlike static images produced by MRI and radiologic imaging, dynamic hip ultrasound allows clinicians to see inside a patient’s joint as they move through a variety of positions.

Ballet dancers' feet are prone to fractures and other damage. Landing incorrectly (not through the foot, with knees bent) from jumps and dancing on pointe may increase the risk of broken bones and weakened ankles if care and attention is not taken by a conscientious teacher or student. Tendonitis is common in female ballet dancers because pointe work is strenuous on their ankles. Landing from jumps incorrectly may also lead to shin splints, in which the muscle separates from the bone.

Class time is used to correct any habits that could lead to injury. If the ballet dancer is properly trained, the dancer will decrease the risk of injury. Some ballet dancers also turn to stretching or other methods of cross training, like Pilates, yoga, non impact cardio, and swimming. This outside training attempts to minimize the risk of bodily damage by increasing strength, exercise diversity and stamina. Modern ballet companies around the world pay intense attention to the prevention of injuries and many ballet companies have in-house health suites providing facilities and expert guidance to dancers. Most ballet companies and ballet boarding schools also employ their own physiotherapists. The Australian Ballet invented a calf rise exercise to prevent injuries; that exercise is now being used by ballet companies across the globe. This exercise is often being featured during livestreams on World Ballet Day.

== Gendered titles ==
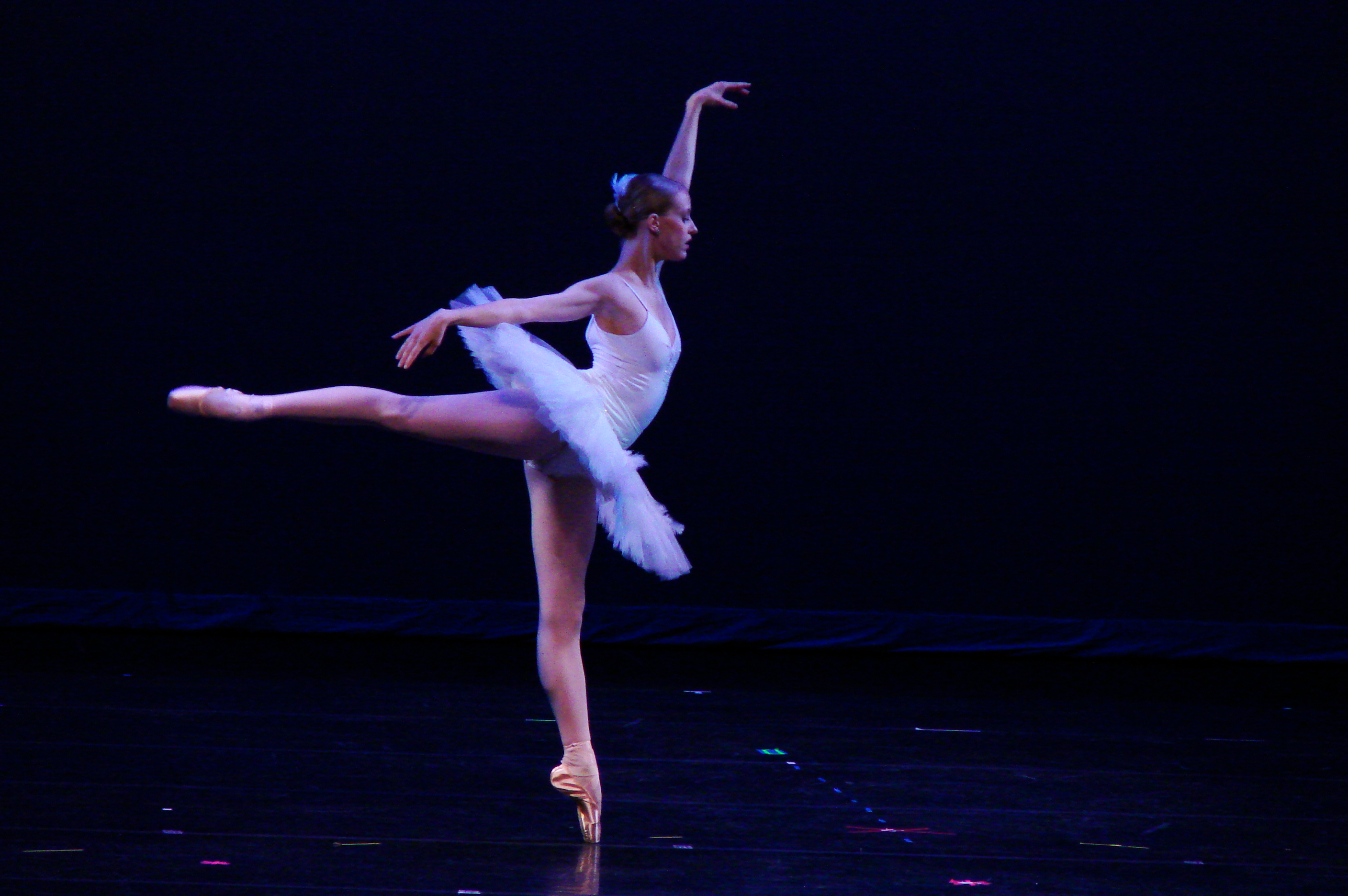
Ballerina

The terminology of professional ballet has historically been strictly gendered, reflecting the social and aristocratic hierarchies of Western Europe from the 17th through the 19th centuries. As ballet transitioned from an Italian court spectacle to a codified French art form under Louis XIV, titles served to define not only a dancer’s technical proficiency but also their perceived social and moral standing.

In the 17th and 18th centuries, ballet was a male-dominated discipline. The premier rank was the danseur noble, a title reserved for men who possessed a refined, "princely" physique and specialized in serious, aristocratic roles. Female dancers did not achieve professional parity in titles until the late 17th century, with the debut of Mademoiselle De Lafontaine in 1681. By the 18th century, the Italian school introduced the term ballerina (feminine) and ballerino (masculine) to distinguish gendered performers, though the French danseur and danseuse remained the standard in professional academies.

The 19th-century Romantic era marked a seismic shift toward the feminization of ballet. The development of pointe work and the "ethereal" aesthetic elevated the female dancer to the center of the art form, leading to the creation of the highest honorific: prima ballerina assoluta. Conversely, the status of the male dancer declined in Western Europe; the term cavalier emerged to describe a man whose primary function was to support the ballerina. In many 19th-century French productions, male roles were even performed by women en travestie (in cross-dress), further marginalizing masculine titles.

In the 20th and 21st centuries, the industry has largely moved toward gender-neutral professional hierarchies. Most major companies, such as the Royal Ballet and American Ballet Theatre, now utilize the unisex rank of Principal Dancer or Principal Artist. While "ballerina" remains a popular cultural term, its use in professional settings is increasingly specific to the highest rank, while "ballet dancer" is preferred as an inclusive, gender-neutral descriptor.

== Hierarchic titles ==
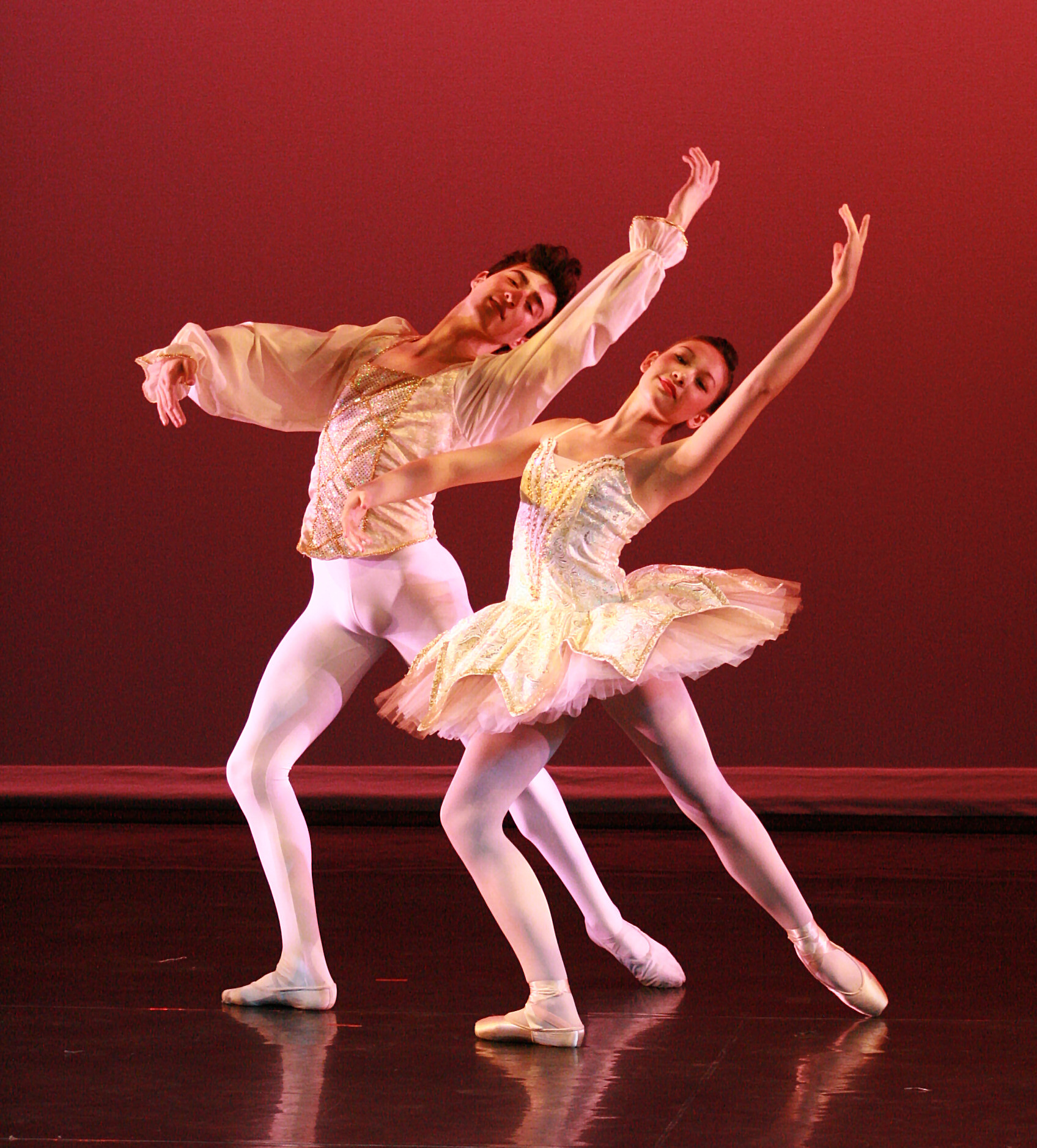
Dancers performing Paquita grand pas de deux entrée

Ballet companies continue to rank their dancers in hierarchical fashion; most have adopted a gender-neutral classification system. In most large companies, there are usually several leading dancers of each sex, titled principal dancer or étoile to reflect their seniority, and more often, their status within the company. The most common rankings in English are:

- Principal dancer
- Soloist (or First soloist)
- Demi-soloist (or Second soloist)
- First Artist
- Corps de ballet (or Artist)
- Apprentice (or Junior Company/Young Dancers programme)

Some ballet companies also run a separate company for their youngest recruits. Such is the case with the Dutch National Ballet which has launched the Junior Company, which at times also tours and performs separately. The UK-based Royal Ballet runs the Aud Jebsen Young Dancers Programme. Dancers who are identified as a guest artist are usually those who have achieved a high rank with their home company, and have subsequently been engaged to dance with other ballet companies around the world, normally performing the lead role. They are usually principal dancers or soloists with their home company, but given the title of Guest Artist when performing with another company. Well-known guest artists include Marianela Nunez and Kathryn Morgan.

=== Changes in terminology ===
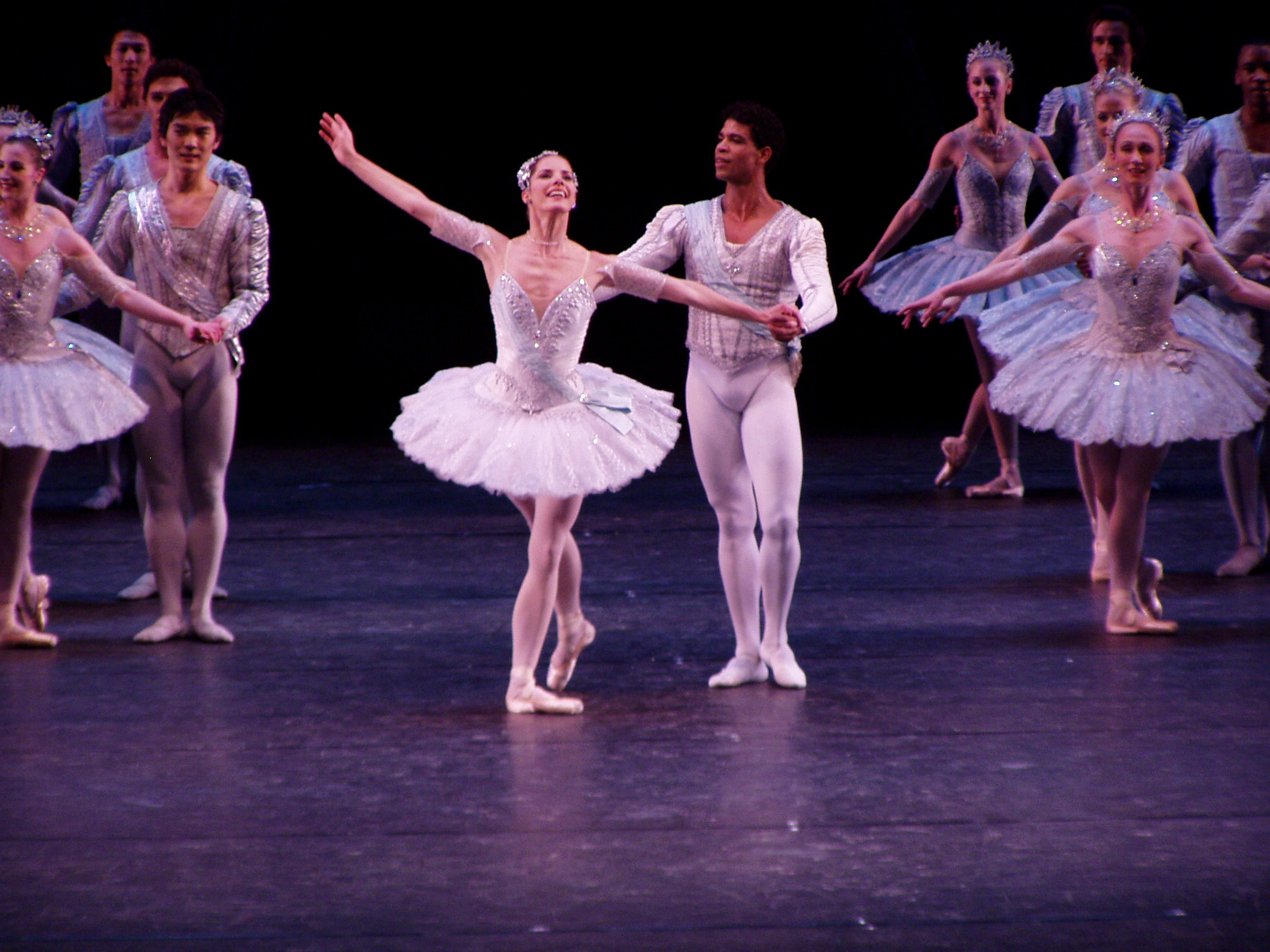
The Royal Ballet's Darcey Bussell and Carlos Acosta at the curtain call of Theme and Variations

The evolution of terminology in classical ballet reflects broader shifts in social hierarchy, gender dynamics, and the professionalization of the art form. Since its origins in the 17th-century French court under King Louis XIV, ballet has relied on a rigid naming conventions to define a dancer’s technical proficiency, physical aesthetic, and rank within a company. These naming conventions were initially designed to mirror the aristocratic structures of the era, where titles carried specific weight.

Historically, the highest rank for a female dancer was the prima ballerina, a title that signaled she was the lead of her company. In some rare instances of extreme prestige, the superlative prima ballerina assoluta was used, a rank reserved for dancers of international renown such as Anna Pavlova or Margot Fonteyn. The male equivalent term was danseur noble, used for dancers whose physical proportions and refined technique made them suitable for "princely" roles. A danseur noble focused on the elegance of the dance rather than the more athletic displays of other male dancers.

Since the mid-20th century, and particularly during the "ballet boom" of the 1960s, these titles have undergone significant semantic bleaching. The word "ballerina," which once denoted an elite soloist of the highest order, began to refer to any female ballet dancer, from a student to a professional member of the company. This shift effectively stripped the term of its original hierarchical meaning in the public eye, though it remains a point of technical distinction within specialized academic circles.

In response to this generalization and a growing desire for gender-neutral professional standards, many modern institutions have transitioned away from gendered titles. Major organizations such as the New York City Ballet, the Royal Ballet, and the American Ballet Theatre now primarily utilize the term principal dancer to denote their lead performers. Despite these changes, certain terms have remained surprisingly resilient to generalization. While "ballerina" expanded to include all women, the term danseur noble has not seen a similar expansion; it remains a specific designation for a male dancer of a particular classical style.

=== Historical rank names, women ===
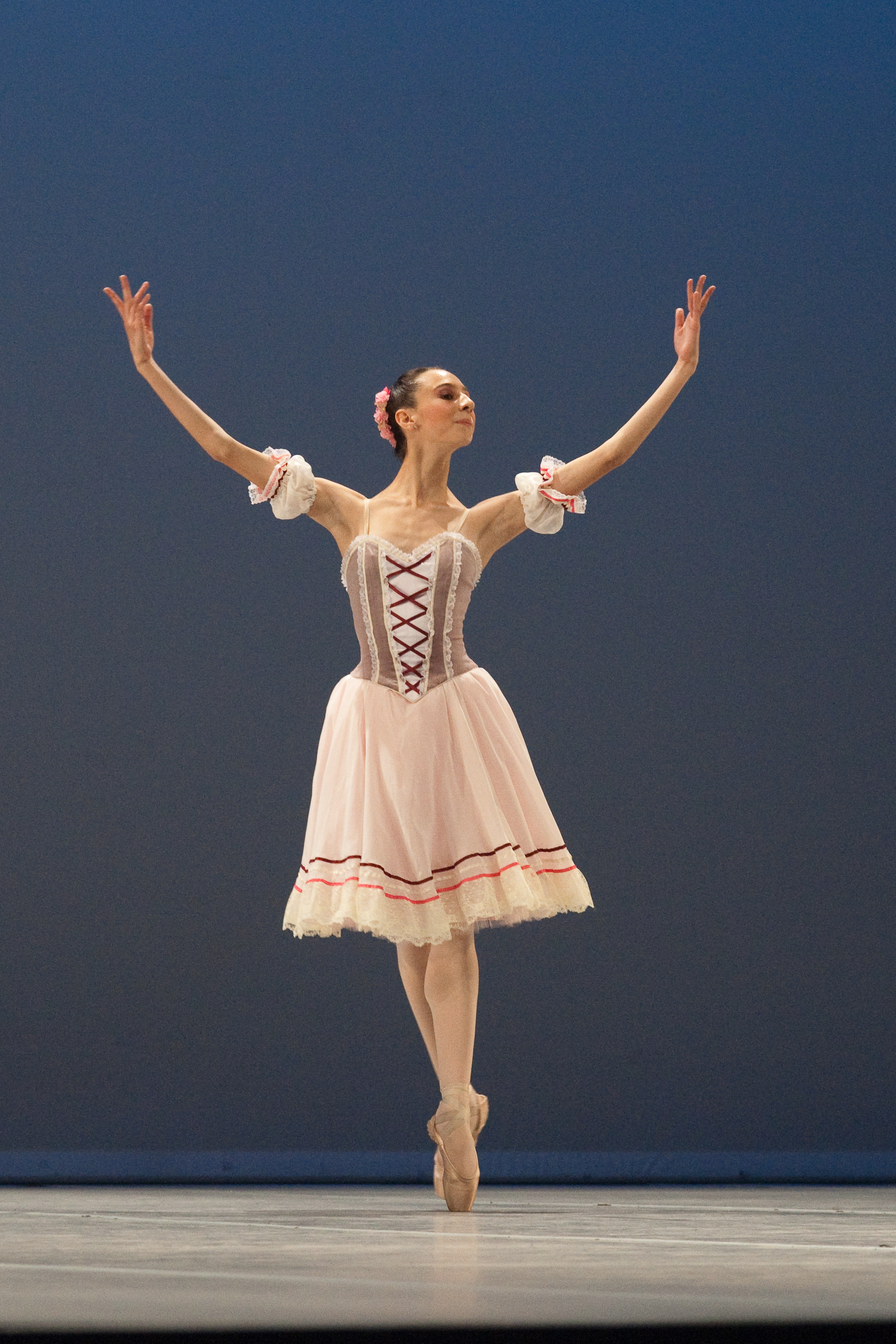
Coppélia, Prix de Lausanne 2010.

More or less, depending on the source, the rankings for women—from highest to lowest—used to be:

- Prima ballerina assoluta
- Prima ballerina, premier sujet or première danseuse
- Sujet
- Coryphée
- Corps de ballet

=== Historical rank names, men ===
For men, the ranks were:

- Premier danseur noble
- Premier danseur
- Danseur
- Sujet
- Coryphée
- Corps de ballet
- Ballerino

== See also ==
- Italian ballet
- Russian ballet
- List of dancers
- Women in dance
- Western stereotype of the male ballet dancer
