= Peggy Willis-Aarnio =

American choreographer, historian, author and teacher

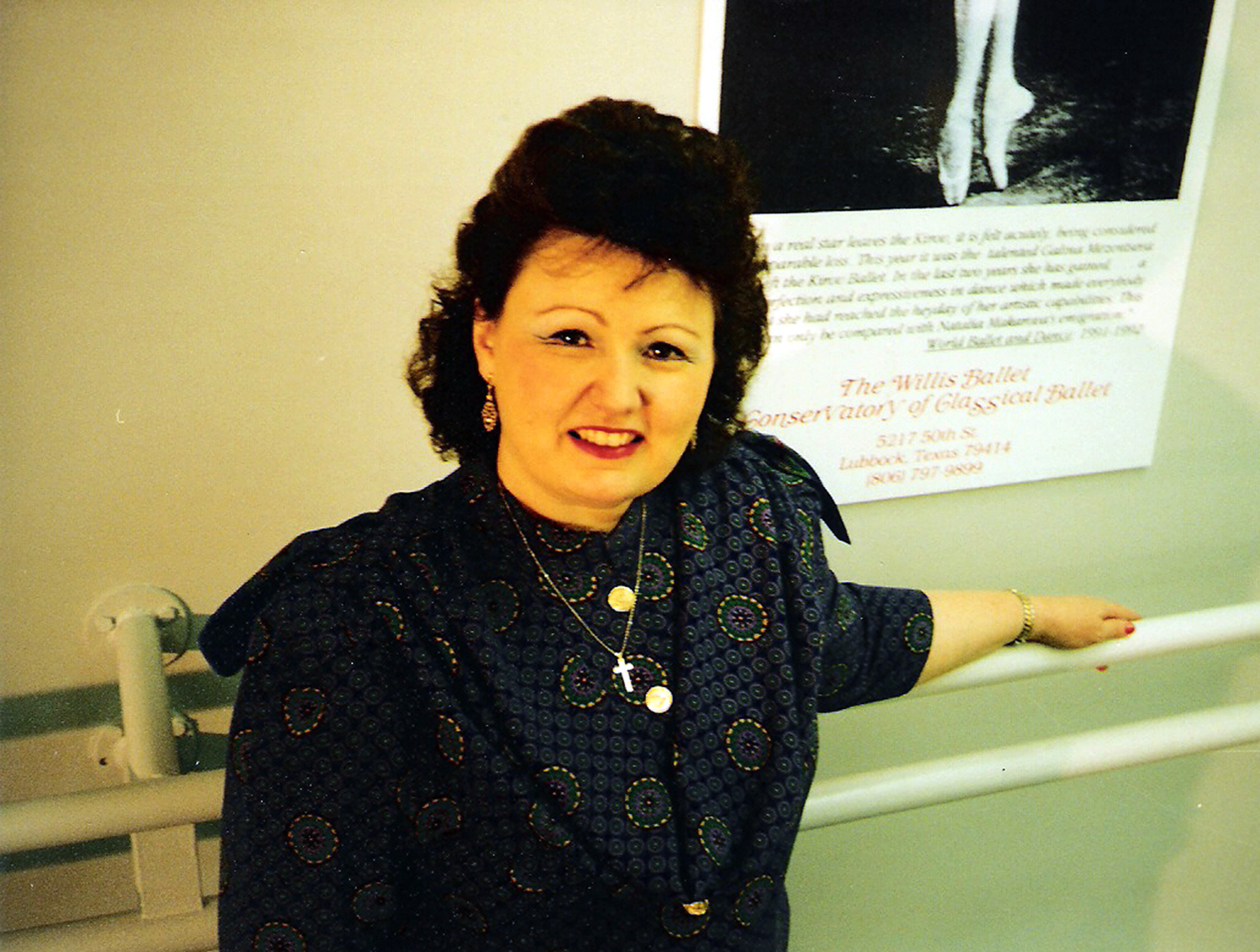
- Born: Margaret Eileen Willis; January 12, 1948; Tampa, Florida, U.S.
- Died: January 9, 2016 (aged 67); Panama City, Florida, U.S.
- Education: Texas Christian University (BFA, MFA)
- Occupations: Choreographer, ballet teacher, author, historian of ballet

Peggy Willis-Aarnio (January 12, 1948 – January 9, 2016) was an American choreographer, historian, author and teacher of classical ballet. She was a professional dancer in the early 1970s with the Fort Worth Ballet in Fort Worth, Texas. She was the first American to be sanctioned as a "Certified Practitioner and Teacher of the Teaching Method of Classical Ballet" by the Vaganova Academy in Saint Petersburg, Russia.

== Career ==
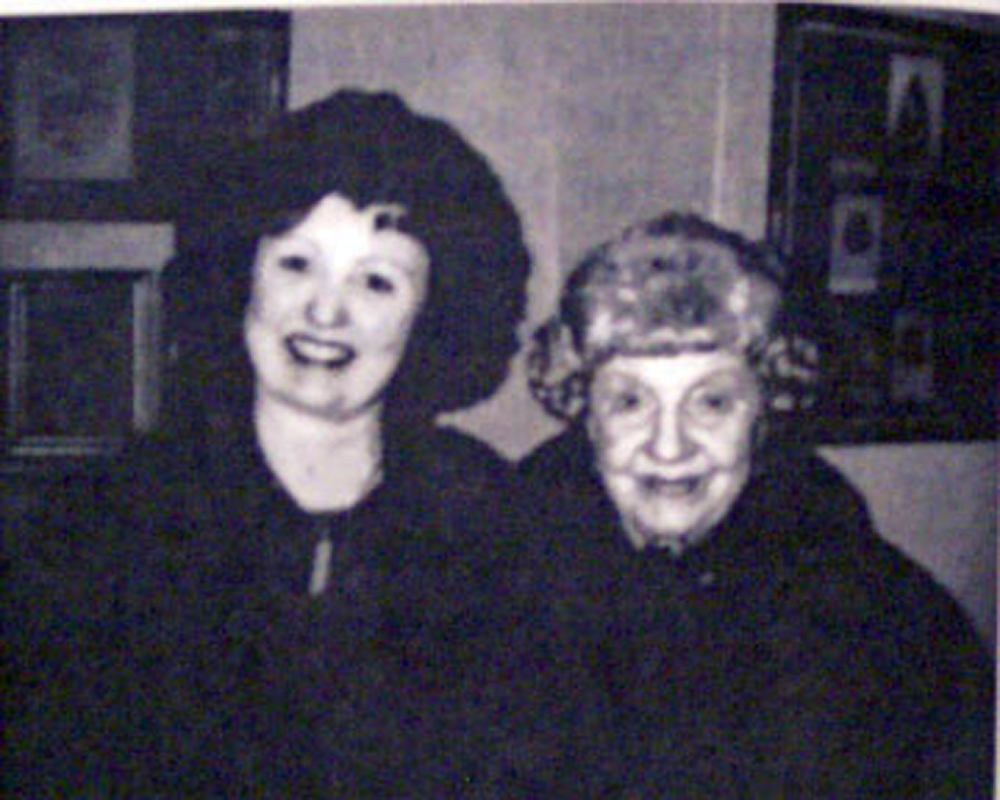
Willis-Aarnio with Natalia Dudinskaya in 1998

Willis-Aarnio was a professor emerita and former head of the Dance Program in the Department of Theatre and Dance at Texas Tech University in Lubbock, Texas. She retired from active teaching after thirty-one years, but remained on the Graduate Faculty. She received her B.F.A. and her M.F.A. Degrees from Texas Christian University in 1970 and 1972.

She studied with John Barker of New York, and Valentina Roumiantseva of the Vaganova Ballet Academy of St. Petersburg, Russia. In 1992, she received an invitation to complete her advanced level pedagogical studies in Teaching Method at the Vaganova Ballet Academy in Saint Petersburg, Russia.

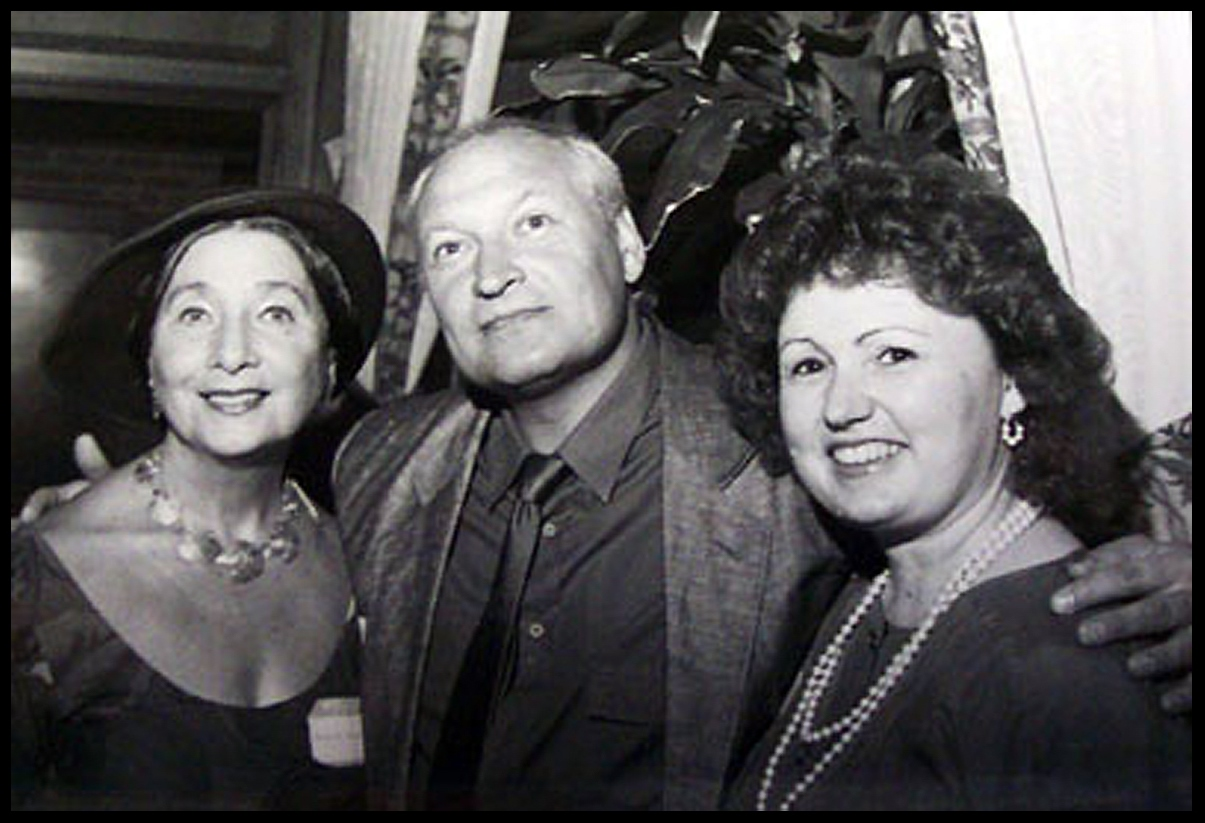
with Natalia Krassovska and Valery Panov.

Willis-Aarnio choreographed more than 80 original ballets, including Dracula: The Ballet which aired on PBS in 1982. She created over 70 original ballets and modern ballet works for Texas Tech University students.

She created two Classical Ballets for the Saint-Petersburg State and Academic Ballet (under the direction of Askold Makarov) and their guest soloist Galina Mezentseva. She created the Diamond Ballet in 1999 for the St Petersburg Ballet Theatre of Konstantin Tatchkine. Other works by Peggy Willis-Aarnio include Beethoven: A Classical Inspiration (2000) The Bluegrass Fantasy (2005) and The Seven Last Words of Christ (2007) (based on the production by Iris Hensley) choreographed for the Saint-Petersburg Classic Ballet Theatre of Marina Medvetskaya.

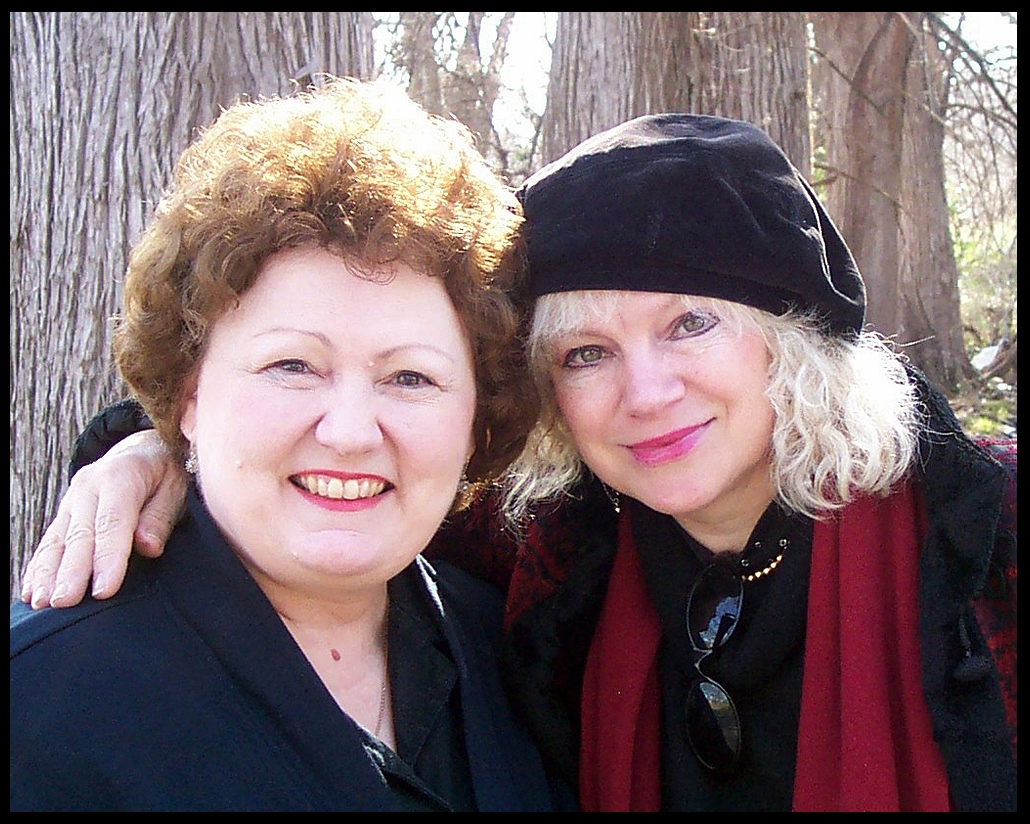
with Galina Panova.

Willis-Aarnio's publications include Agrippina Vaganova (1879–1951): her place in the history of ballet and her impact on the future of classical dance, published in 2002, and the How to Teach Classical Ballet series. She wrote, directed and supervised the series Music for the Classical Ballet Lesson with Ludmilla Petrovna Vlasenko as pianist, and wrote, directed and narrated the video series Classical Ballet Lesson which featured Galina Mezentseva. She also produced numerous educational materials throughout her 32 years as a professor at Texas Tech University.

== Early life ==
Peggy Willis-Aarnio was born in Tampa, Florida. Her mother was Margaret Spangler Maria Dozier, who was business manager in a hospital. Her step-father, Walter H. Dozier, was a naval officer. He was the chief pay clerk for NATO. The family moved to Naples, Italy, where her mother enrolled her at the age of 8 and her sister Sheila, at age 6, in ballet lessons with Peggy Burns, who had been trained at Sadler's Wells in London. She returned to Florida when her father was stationed at the Navy Mine Defense Laboratory.

Willis-Aarnio graduated from Bay High School in 1966. During her years at Bay High School, she held the office of president of the drama club, and secretary of her junior class. She won second place in the Panama City Beauty Pageant. She attended Texas Christian University, where she was invited to perform in the American Festival in the UK. During the summers of 1969, 1970 and 1971, she and her sister Sheila Willis were hired as performers at Mr. Koplin's Tombstone Territory on Panama City Beach. During her last summer there, at age 21, she was hired as director and choreographer.

In 1972, Willis-Aarnio received an invitation to join the faculty at Texas Tech University as an assistant professor. Willis-Aarnio's sister Sheila went on to a career in dance, after receiving a Bachelor of Fine Arts degree from Texas Christian University, performing professionally with Iris Hensley in Marietta, Georgia (now the Georgia Ballet), and also with the Pittsburgh Dance Alloy. Sheila studied and prepared for a second career in design while she was living in Pittsburgh, and earned an associate degree in Interior Design from the Art Institute in Pittsburgh.

== Personal life ==
Willis-Aarnio was married to Paul Aarnio, son of the internationally renowned architect Reino Aarnio and Sylvia (née Bachman) Aarnio, lyric soprano and graduate of the Juilliard School of Music.

Paul Aarnio holds a Bachelor of Architecture degree (with honors) from Cornell University, and is a retired Air force pilot.

Peggy Willis-Aarnio and her sister Sheila Willis-Kleiman had a lifelong collaboration of teaching, performing, choreographing their entire lives together. They began their beginning ballet classes at the same time, attended Texas Christian University together, shared an apartment and taught ballet together to earn their way through college.

== Death ==
Peggy Willis-Aarnio died on January 9, 2016, three days before her 68th birthday from undisclosed causes.

Sheila Willis Kleiman formed the Performing Arts Cultural Exchange a 501(c)3 Foundation in 2018 to continue Peggy Willis-Aarnio's teaching legacy which provides scholarships in her name called The Peggy Willis Classical Ballet Scholarship Award Program.

== Awards and honors ==
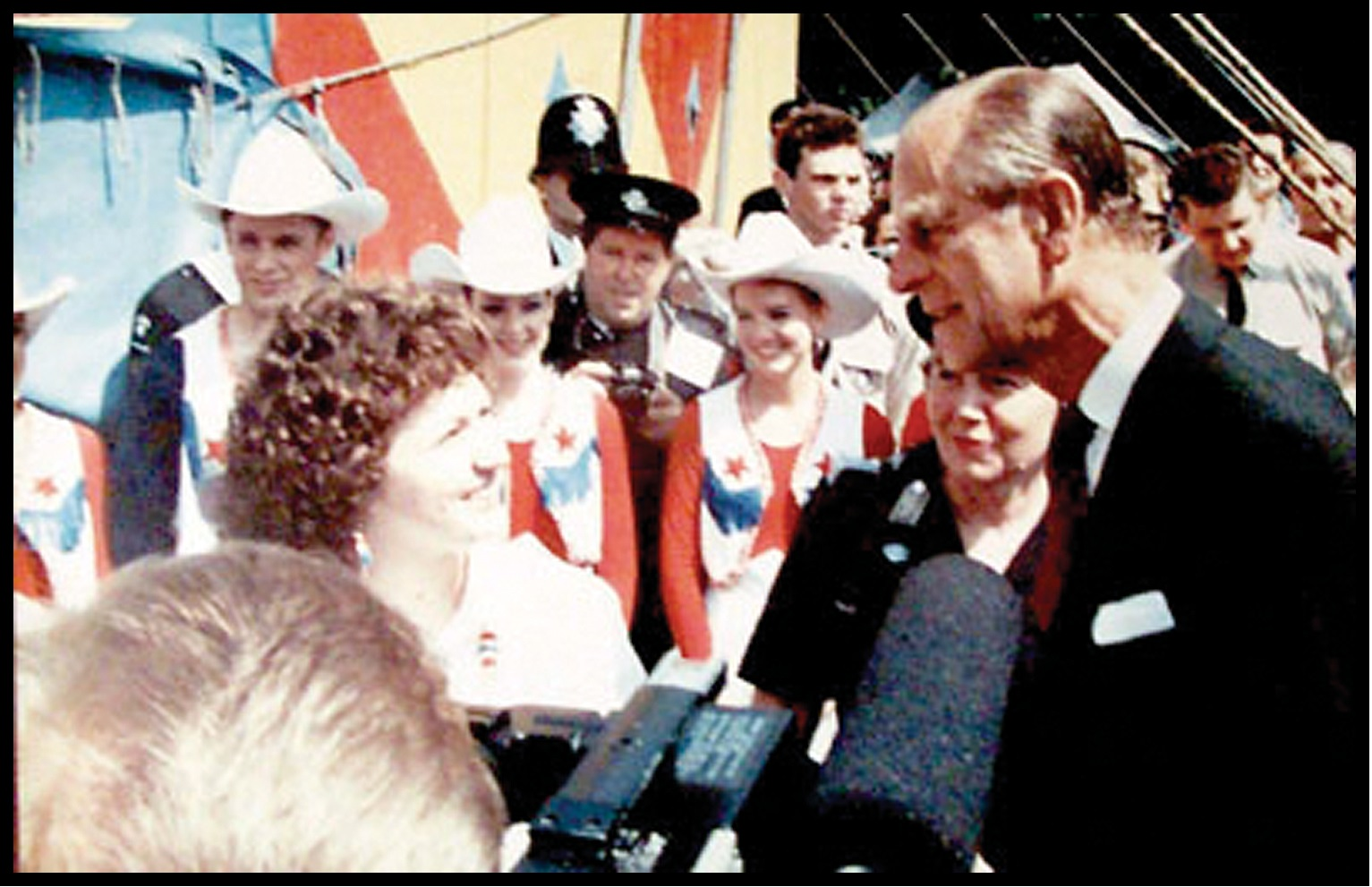
Willis-Aarnio with Prince Philip in 1987

Willis-Aarnio received Texas Christian University's Alfie Special Achievement Award for her choreography in Gilbert and Sullivan's ballad operetta, Patience. In 1998, she received the "Woman of Excellence Award in the Arts" from the YWCA, City of Lubbock, Texas.

Willis-Aarnio held the honor of being the first American to choreograph a new classical ballet work for several top Russian Companies in Saint-Petersburg, Russia. She was an honorary member and North American representative of the Society of Russian Style Ballet. Her ballet company, The Willis Ballet, toured England in 1987 and performed for Queen Elizabeth and Prince Philip.

In 1977 and again in 1981, Willis-Aarnio visited Moscow Russia with the John Barker Ballet Competition Tour, on a two-week visit to watch the III and IV Moscow International Ballet Competition.

Willis-Aarnio was certified to teach the Vaganova classical ballet training program outside of Russia. Peggy Willis-Aarnio and Sheila Willis Kleiman produced The Willis Ballet Educational DVD Library, which includes classical ballet music and serves as a companion to the How to Teach Classical Ballet books. These materials feature Galina Mezentseva's training during her tenure as a Kirov ballerina. Olga Rozanova, a dance critic and faculty dean in St. Petersburg, described the videos as educational resources.

TCU Mary Couts Burnett Library Collection Peggy Willis-Aarnio

https://archives.tcu.edu/repositories/2/top_containers/7442
