= Irina Kolesnikova =

Russian ballet dancer (born 1980)

Irina Kolesnikova (Russian: Ирина Владимировна Коле́сникова; born 1980) is a Russian ballet dancer. She is the prima ballerina of the St Petersburg Ballet Theatre.

== Biography ==
She graduated from the Vaganova Ballet Academy in 1998, class of Elvira Korkorina, and after being rejected by the Kirov and Mikhailovsky Theatre, she joined the St Petersburg Ballet Theatre (SPBT), where she was taught by Svetlana Efremova. With this corps, she has toured internationally, playing mostly Odette/Odile in Swan Lake. Other roles in her repertoire include the title role and Myrtha in Giselle, Clara in The Nutcracker, Maria in St Petersburg's Nutcracker, Princess Aurora and Fairy Claire Bonté in The Sleeping Beauty, Kitri and Queen of Dryads in Don Quixote, Nikiya and Princess Gamzatti in La Bayadere, Juliet in Romeo and Juliet, Carmen in Her Name Was Carmen, Paquita, Chopiniana and others.

On 26 December 2002 Kolesnikova made her London debut in Royal Albert Hall in St. Petersburg Ballet Theatre's Swan Lake. Dance critic Allen Robertson of The Times said:

Irina Kolesnikova, star of St Petersburg Ballet Theatre's touring production of Swan Lake, has made a decision which throws the entire story into high relief. She portrays both Odette, the princess who is magicked into a swan, and Odile, her wicked impersonator, as if they really are birds...

Kolesnikova's imperiousness has a ruthless, vicious nature. She's mesmerizing poor Siegfried rather than flirting with him. The result is as exciting and audacious as it is theatrically credible, even in a venue as large as the Albert Hall...

Opulent and grand, Kolesnikova is a ballerina of prodigious technical strengths. Her dancing is writ large but never over-emphatic. Everything she does comes from deep inside her.

In 2002, Irina Kolesnikova participated in international ballet competitions where she became a laureate of the following awards:

- Natalia Makarova Prize and the Silver Medal at Arabesque 2002 in Russia
- Silver Medal at the world-renowned International Ballet Competition in Varna
- Gold Medal at the International Ballet Competition in Prague

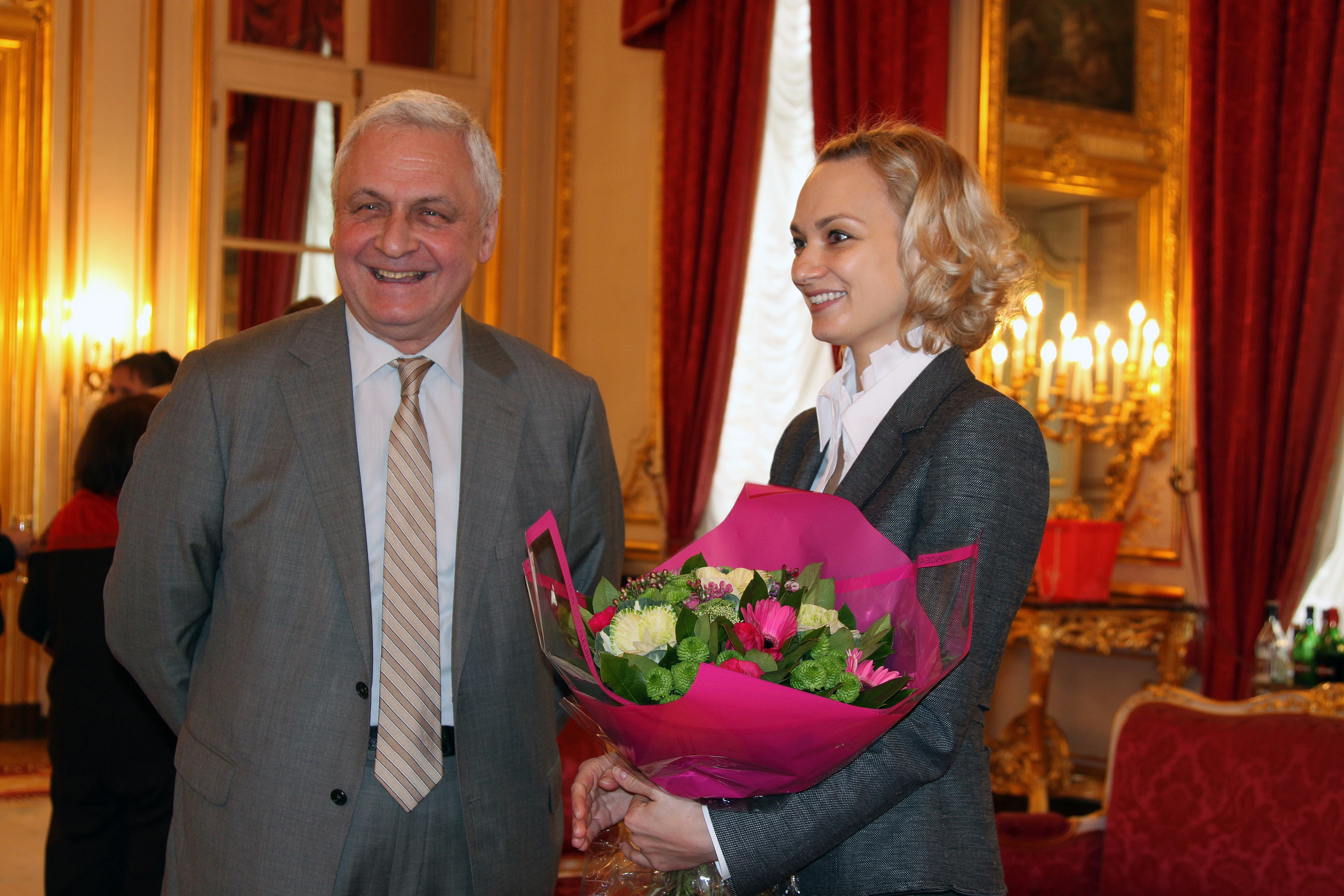
Irina Kolesnikova with the Russian Ambassador to France, Alexander Orlov. 6 February 2012, Paris.

In 2004 in St Petersburg there has been published the book of photographs "Irina Kolesnikova". It was dedicated to 10th anniversary of the St Petersburg Ballet Theatre and with introduction article entitled "Irina Kolesnikova my love" written by the Russian-American ballet critic and photographer Nina Alovert.

In 2004 Kolesnikova was nominated for Prix Benois de la Danse for her performing role Kitri in Don Quixote.

In 2005 Kolesnikova was nominated in London for a National Dance Awards as Best Female Dancer by the UK critics’ circle for her performing the role of Odette-Odile in Swan Lake.

In 2005, Kolesnikova took place in V Japan International Ballet Competition in Nagoya where she won the Silver Medal. The Chief of Jury of this competition was a great Russian ballerina Maya Plisetskaya.

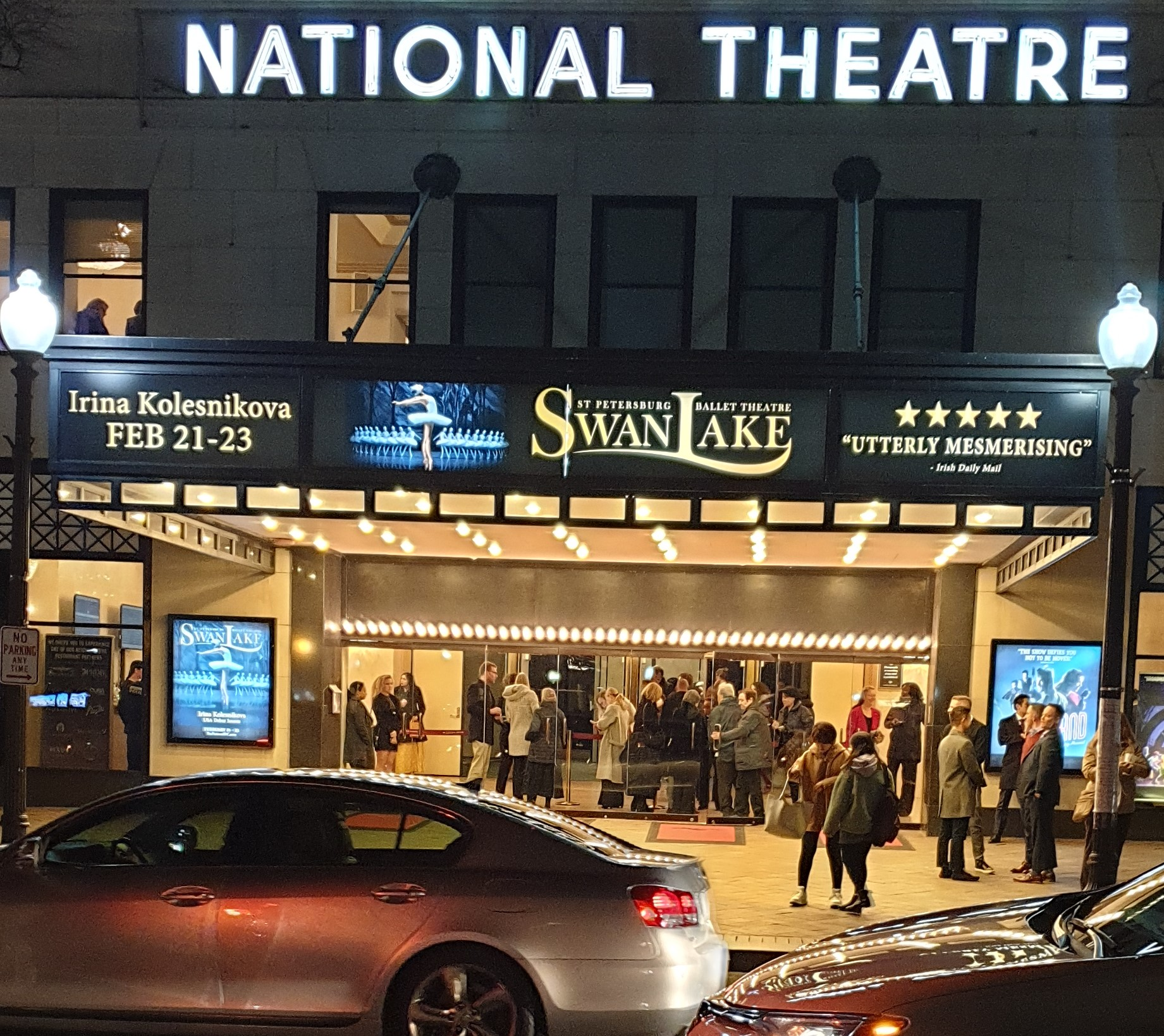
The front entrance of the National Theatre. 21 February 2020. Washington D.C.

In 2006 St Petersburg Ballet Theatre (SPBT) released the first DVD with Irina Kolesnikova. Live performance of Swan Lake was filmed at the State Theatre in Pretoria on 2 April 2006 during the first ever St Petersburg Ballet Theatre tour in South Africa.

In 2007 St Petersburg Ballet Theatre (SPBT) released the DVD Giselle with Irina Kolesnikova. Live ballet was filmed at the State Theatre in Pretoria on 16 March 2007 during the returning visit of St Petersburg Ballet Theatre to South Africa.

In September 2007 she danced Sheherezade for the first time at the Gala des Etoiles du XXIe Siecle in Paris, partnered by Dmitri Semionov. Her coaches include Honoured Artists of Russia Alla Osipenko and Lubov Kunakova.

In June 2008 Irina made her West-End debut in London at Apollo Theatre. As a guest star she was dancing the role of Hollywood legend Judy Garland in the contemporary production of choreographer Peter Schaufuss "DIVAS" from 19 June to 5 July.

Debra Craine, the lead critic of The Times, in the review published on 27 June 2008 said:

"...Irina Kolesnikova may present a statuesque and very Russian Garland, but she exudes the kind of grand personality (and sumptuous technique) that sweeps all before it. Charming and charismatic, she’s the one true diva..."

On 17 May 2009 Irina made her debut on the stage of the London Coliseum. She was dancing the role of Nikiya in St Petersburg Ballet Theatre’s La Bayadere.

On 6 February 2012, a dinner in honour of the Prima Ballerina, Kolesnikova, took place at the Russian Federation Ambassador’s residence, France with the presence of Alexander Orlov, Ambassador of the Russian Federation to France. The visit was recorded by the State Russian Television and broadcast on Russian television on 13 February 2012.

The previous night saw the end of the St Petersburg Ballet Theatre’s Paris season where, overall, the season included 15 sold out shows which were played to 48 thousand visitors.

In 2020, Kolesnikova made her United States debut, performing at Howard Gilman Opera House BAM, New York City and National Theatre, Washington DC.

== Royal Albert Hall, London ==
From 2002 to 2007 Kolesnikova was annually performing in Royal Albert Hall. During this time, the St Petersburg Ballet Theatre presented Kolesnikova in "Swan Lake" – 2002, 2005, 2007 and "The Nutcracker" – 2003, 2004, 2006.

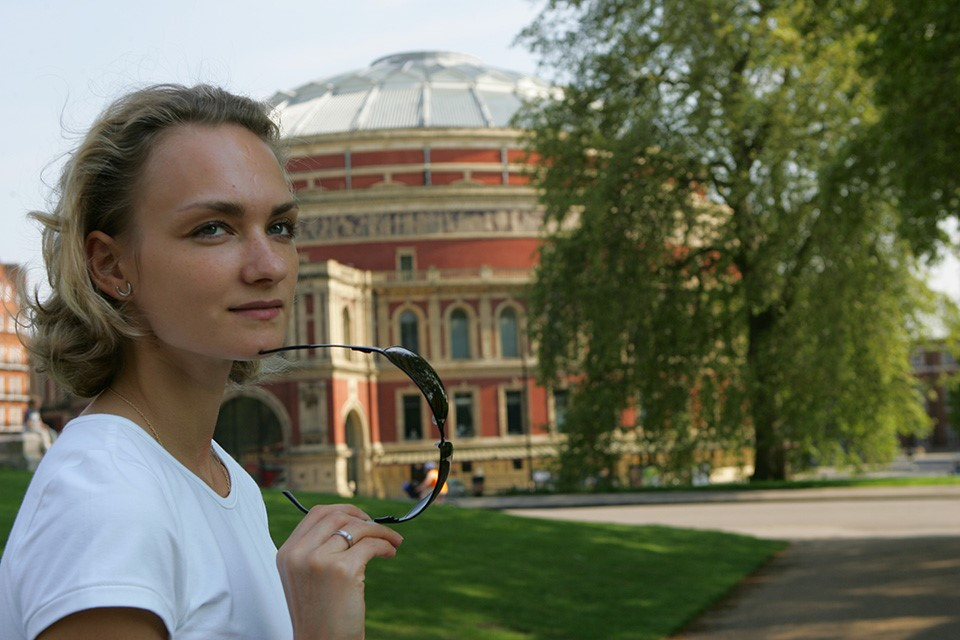
Irina Kolesnikova in front of the Royal Albert Hall. 11 May 2006, London.

Performance on 21 Nov 2005 was special for Kolesnikova, because for a very first time her name as a ballerina dancing the role of Odette-Odile was announced to a public a few months in advance. Three hours prior to this performance she gave an interview to BBC London TV News In the report broadcast in London same evening BBC called Kolesnikova "the main attraction and box office draw."

On 24 November 2005, The Times published the review where its critic Donald Hutera said:

"Trained at the Vaganova Academy, the 25-year-old is a real artist whose gifts include expressive arms, a pliant torso and a meltingly slow, expansive yet detailed style that draws us right to her. Recently nominated for a National Dance Award as best female dancer by the UK critics, Kolesnikova is a dream of an Odette...

In the fourth act Kolesnikova, wrapped in tragic melancholia, surrendered to the faintly ridiculous happy ending left over from the Soviet era. Despite the wet finish, the evening was a triumph for her..."

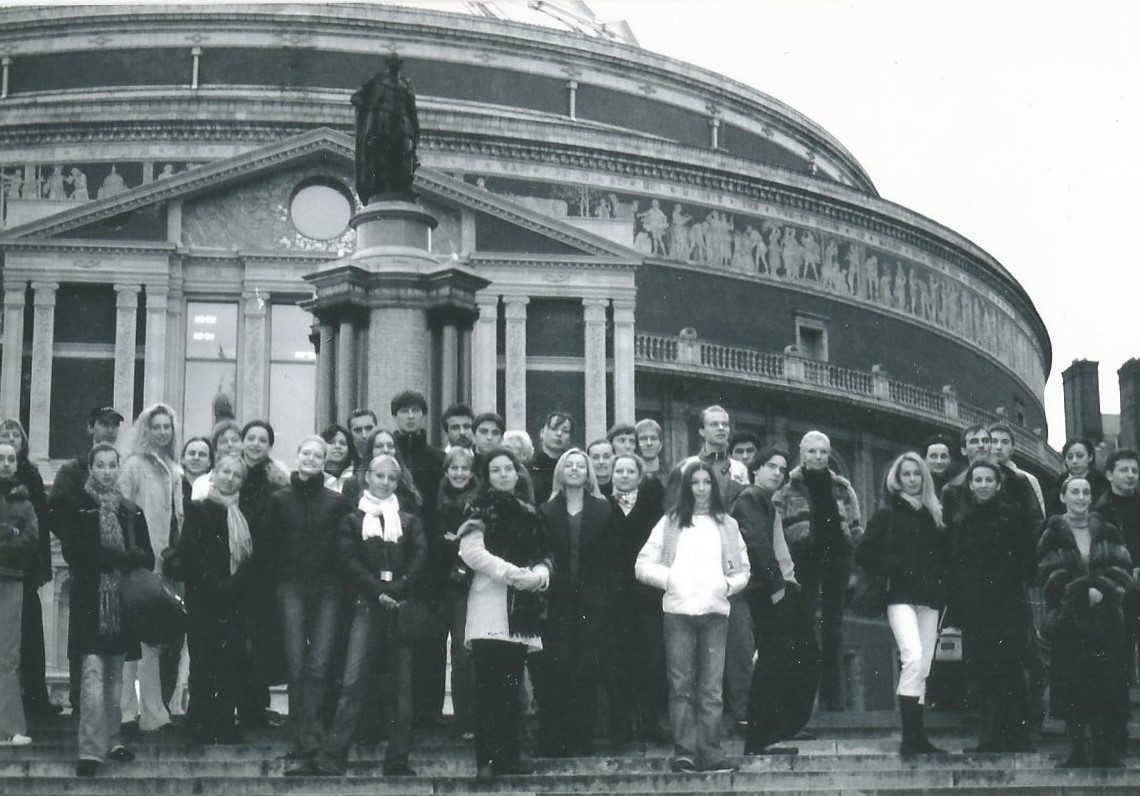
SPBT’s members in front of the Royal Albert Hall. 22 November 2004, London

On 24 November 2005, the critic Laura Thompson in review published in The Daily Telegraph said:

"...But St Petersburg Ballet Theatre has an absolute belief in itself, and in ballet. It also has an ace up its sleeve in Irina Kolesnikova, its Odette-Odile, who has a statuesque allure and firm technique. Her deliberate playing to strengths (she favours, for example, a baroque curving attitude in which her back meets her lifted leg) is too knowing. But, if she is an old-fashioned star, a star she undoubtedly is."

On 26 November 2005, national The Observer also published the review, where its critic Jann Parry said:

"Of the many troupes which tour the United Kingdom at this time of year, the St Petersburg Ballet Theatre is one of the best. The leading dancer, Irina Kolesnikova, is a grandly glamorous ballerina. She gives a soulful account of Odette/Odile in a production based on the Kirov's. Her interpretation is so steeped in tragedy that the happy ending, a Soviet-era aberration, seems more incongruous than ever."

== Paris Theater des Champs-Elysees ==
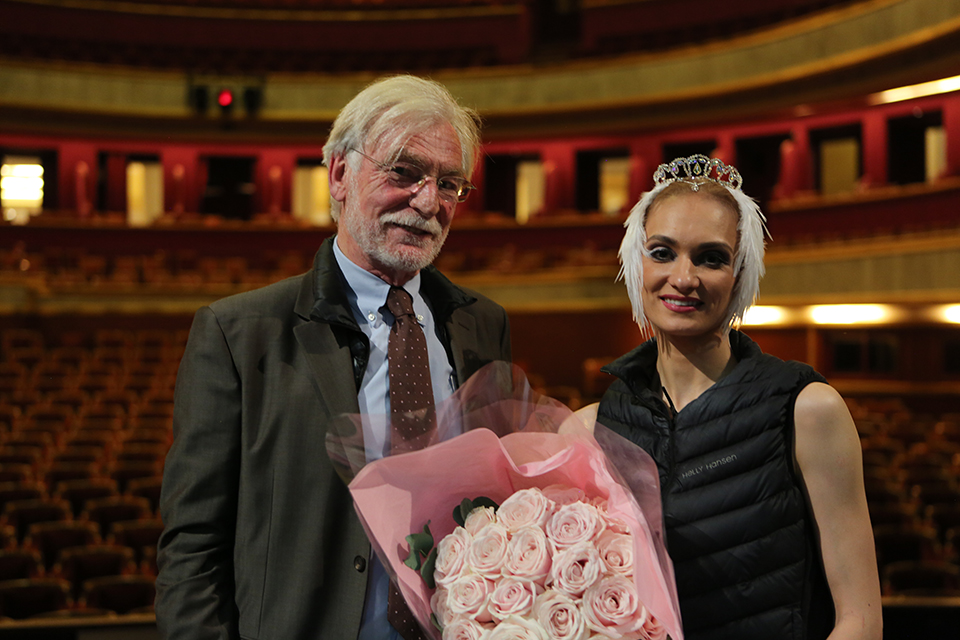
Irina Kolesnikova with Francis Lepigeon, former Director of the Theatre des Champs-Elysees. Just after performance. 22.02.2018, Paris.

In 2018, Kolesnikova celebrated the 10th anniversary of her annual Parisian seasons, which regularly take place on the legendary Theater des Champs-Elysees stage. During this time, in addition to with world's favourite Swan Lake the other masterpieces of world choreography were presented to the Parisian public, such as:

- Don Quixote (2009, 2016)
- Giselle (2009, 2017)
- La Bayadere (2009, 2015)
- The Nutcracker (2011)
- Sleeping Beauty (2011)
- St Petersburg’s Nutcracker (2013, 2016)
- Romeo and Juliet (2015)
- Chopiniana and Paquita (2018)

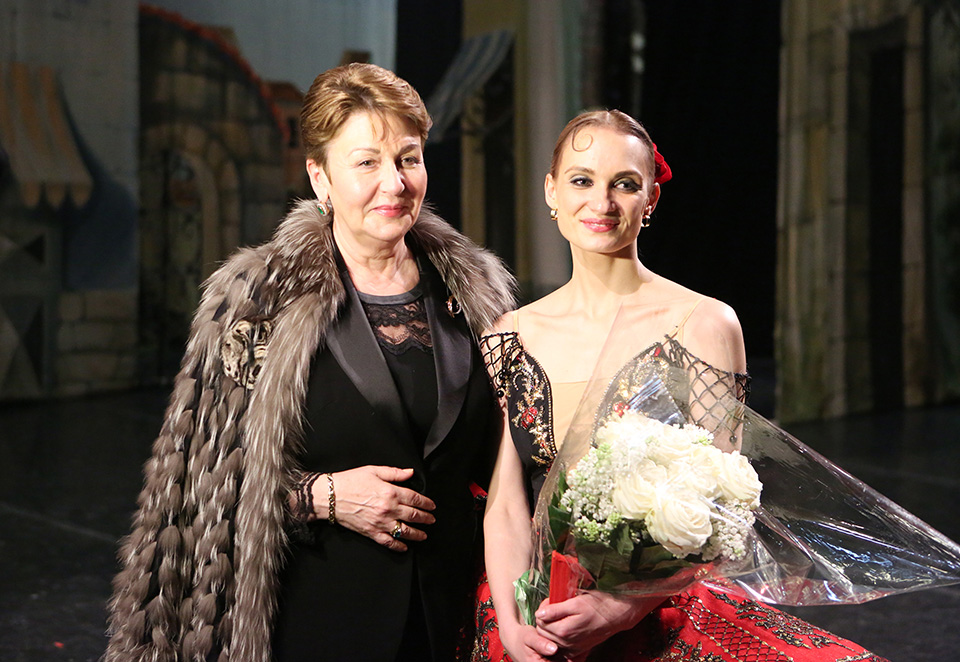
Irina Kolesnikova with Eleonora Mitrofanova, Permanent Delegate of Russia to UNESCO. Theatre des Champs-Elysees. 26.02.2016, Paris

During Kolesnikova's seasons in Paris, Journal du Dimanche published a review "Triumph of the White Swan after the Black" by famous Parisian critic Nicole Duault, who named Kolesnikova "a diva of dance, with whom very few stars can compare". The Parisian Journal, Danse (№260, April 2011), summed up the many reviews that Kolesnikova received for her interpretation of the role of Odette/Odile, when its dance journalist, Margarita Medina, wrote:

"Thanks to this amazingly supple dancer, an artist from head to toe, we got to see the truly ideal Swan. Her tenderness and timidity were very touching. Her assured équilibre, her pirouettes, the span of her développés all combined with the beauty of her port de bras.

Irina united drama with virtuosity in her marvellous illustration of the double-sided nature of this role. Her Black Swan was imposing and self-assured. Her perfect pirouettes and double and triple fouettés electrified the audience of the Théâtre des Champs Elysées.

Her lack of any internal tension, freedom of movement and her expressiveness all combine to allow us to place this Saint Petersburg star, pleasant behind the scenes and brilliant on stage, at the summit of a choreographic Olympia alongside the other outstanding talents of her generation."

== "Her Name Was Carmen" ==
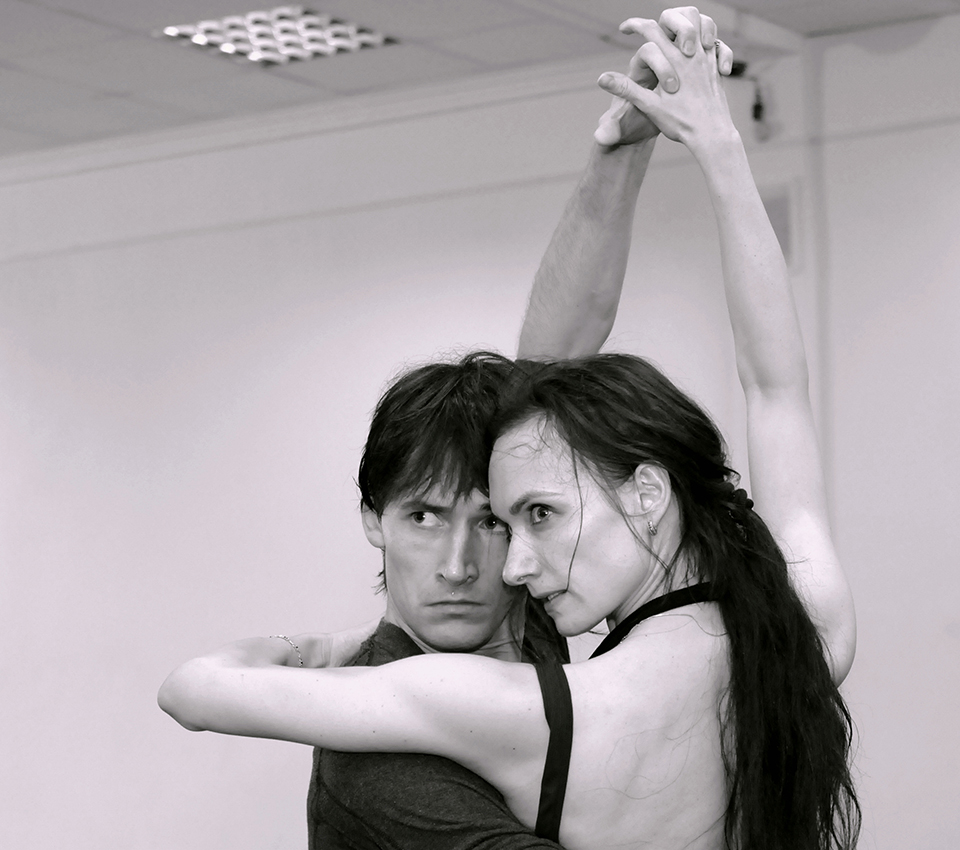
Irina Kolesnikova and Yuri Kovalev during the rehearsal "Her Name Was Carmen", 14.08.2016, St Petersburg

In 2016, Kolesnikova with the support of Oxfam visited two refugee camps in the Balkans in Tabanovce and in Presevo, located four kilometres away over the Serbian border. The stories she heard from refugees gave her conviction in need to bring attention to the refugee crisis and raise awareness of the refugees’ plight in Balkan camps. That it how the idea to create a new ballet "Her Name Was Carmen" with presenting that on the prestigious stage of the London Coliseum appeared.

Kolesnikova's visit has attracted attention by international media:

- Reuters, 22 April 2016
- Evening Standard, 22 April 2016
- Deutsche Welle 25 April 2016
- The Financial Times, 29 April 2016
- The Newsweek, 29 April 2016
- BBC radio Woman’s Hour, 25 August 2016
- The Sunday Express, 7 August 2016
- Daily Mirror, 3 September 2016

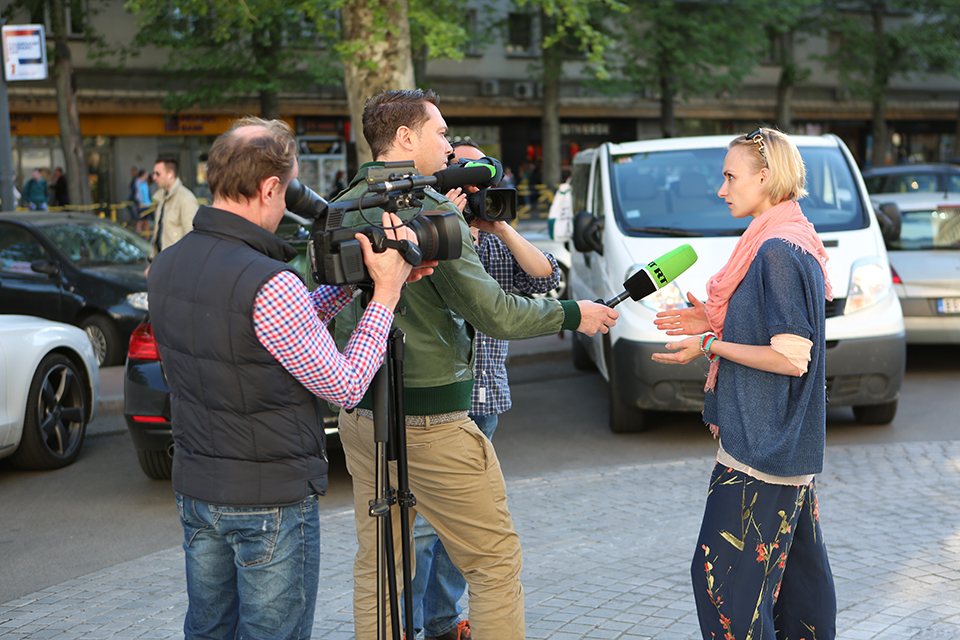
Irina Kolesnikova's interview for RT in Belgrade, 21.04.16

During visiting camp Irina Kolesnikova was moved to tears by the present she got from a one of refugee girl at a camp.

"One little girl followed me around and didn't let go of my hand the entire time. When I had to leave she gave me a small plastic ring that looks like a flower. I have been wearing it ever since and will also wear it at my performance of Carmen; I won't take it off until I know that all children like her are safe" – Irina told during interview to Deutsche Welle on 25 April 2016.

Unfortunately, in two days after Kolesnikova’s visit this girl has disappeared from the camp and no one was able to tell where she was. Kolesnikova took it very personally and this story was included to libretto of "Her Name Was Carmen".

"Her Name Was Carmen" is a tragic story set in a nowadays refugee camp in Balkans. The world’s premier of this two act ballet took place at London Coliseum from 23 to 26 August 2016.

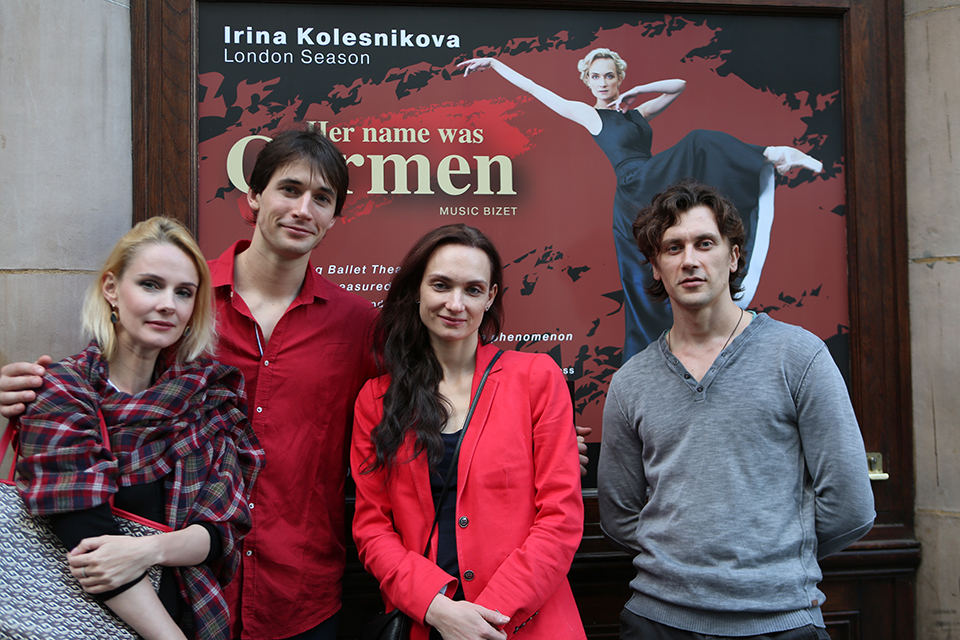
Irina Kolesnikova with Olga Kostel, Yuri Kovalev and Dmitry Akulinin. Front door of the London Coliseum, 28.08.2016

Music: Georges Bizet; Choreography: Olga Kostel

Cast: Carmen – Irina Kolesnikova; Jose – Dmitry Akulinin; Garcia – Yuri Kovalev

The role of the small Syrian girl was played by Kseniya Kosova from Belarus, the pupil of Vezhnovets Ballet School. All four performances of Carmen Kolesnikova danced wearing the actual flower plastic ring gifted to her in the camp. The roles of refugees, policemen, journalists, volunteers and gangsters have been played by soloists and corps de ballet members of the St Petersburg Ballet Theatre (SPBT).

Performances was accompanied by English National Opera symphonic orchestra under button of the Russian conductor Igor Tomashevsky.

Every pound sterling collected from each ticket sold was contributed to Oxfam organization in order to support the refugees in Balkans.

== Repertoire ==
Kolesnikova's repertoire covers many of the classical and romantic ballets, including:

- "Swan Lake", Odette and Odile
- "Giselle", Giselle, Myrtha
- "Paquita"
- "La Bayadere", Nikiya, Princess Gamzatti
- "The Nutcracker", Masha
- "Chopiniana"
- "Divas", Judy Garland (choreography by Peter Schaufuss)
- "St Petersburg's Nutcracker", Maria (choreography by Elena Kuzmina)
- "Don Quixote", Kitri, Queen of the Dryads
- "Romeo and Juliet", Juliet
- "The Sleeping Beauty", Princess Aurora, Fairy Claire Bonté
- “Her Name Was Carmen”, Carmen (choreography by Olga Kostel)
