= Olga Moiseeva =

- О́льга Моисе́ева
- Born: Olga Nikolaevna Moiseeva; 25 December 1928; Leningrad, Russian SFSR, Soviet Union
- Died: 24 June 2021 (aged 92); Saint Petersburg, Russia
- Occupations: Ballerina; Teacher
- Awards: Honored Artist of the RSFSR; People's Artist of the RSFSR; People's Artist of the USSR; Order of Friendship

Olga Nikolaevna Moiseeva (Russian: О́льга Никола́евна Моисе́ева; 25 December 1928 – 24 June 2021) was a Soviet and Russian ballerina and teacher. She was a leading soloist of the Leningrad Kirov Opera and Ballet Theatre in Leningrad (now Saint Petersburg) from 1947 to 1973. Moisseva was later a choreographer and rehearsal teacher at the Kirov Theatre and trained several ballet soloists between 1972 and 1987. She was the recipient of various state awards such as the titles of Honored Artist of the RSFSR, People's Artist of the RSFSR, People's Artist of the USSR and the Order of Friendship.

== Early life ==
Moisseva was born in Leningrad (today Saint Petersburg) on 25 December 1928. She was part of a family that included a singer and teacher. Moisseva graduated from the Leningrad Choreographic School (today the Vaganova Academy of Russian Ballet) under the tutelage of ballerina Agrippina Vaganova in 1947.

== Career ==
Following graduation from the school, she was accepted into the ballet company of the Leningrad Kirov Opera and Ballet Theatre (today the Mariinsky Theatre) in Leningrad in 1947. Moisseva became a leading soloist with the theatre's ballet troupe.

She performed the roles of the ballets produced by Leonid Yakobson (miniature “Mother” to music by Alexander Scriabin called Choreographic Miniatures), Yury Grigorovich (Mekhmeneh Banu in Aleksi Machavariani's The Legend of Love), Konstantin Sergeyev (Gertrude in Hamlet by Vasily Solovyov-Sedoy) and Rostislav Zakharov (Carolina in Solovyov-Sedoy''s The Russia Entered the Port). Other roles Moisseva performed were as Odette-Odile in Pyotr Ilyich Tchaikovsky's Swan Lake, Raymonda in Alexander Glazunov's Raymonda, Nikiya in Ludwig Minkus's La Bayadère, Syuimbike in Färit Yarullin's Shurale, Bianca in Machavariani's Othello, Kitri in Minkus's Don Quixote, Sari in Gara Garayev's The Path of Thunder, Princess Florine in Tchaikovsky's The Sleeping Beauty, Gertrude in Nikolai Chervinsky's Hamlet, Krivlyaka in Sergei Prokofiev's Cinderella, Giselle in Adolphe Adam's ballet called Giselle, Aegina in Aram Khachaturian's Spartacus, Gayane in Khachaturian's Gayane, Elzevira in Oleg Karavaychuk's and Georgy Firtich's The Bedbug, Zarema in Boris Asafyev's The Fountain of Bakhchisarai and as Laurencia in Alexander Krein's Laurencia. She stopped performing in 1973.

From 1972 to 1987, she was a choreographer and rehearsal teacher at the Kirov Theatre and trained several ballet soloists. Moissieva's pupils included the likes of Tatyana Amosova, Altynai Asylmuratova, Galina Mezentseva, Yulia Makhalina, Irma Nioradze, Olesya Novikova, Irina Zhelonkina and Svetlana Zakharova. She also taught in Edinburgh in 1990 and in Berlin in 1991 among other places, and was the lead juror of the Vaganova Prix in Saint Petersburg in 1998. Moisseva provided the following advice to students "Don't repeat, find your own".

== Death ==
She died in Saint Petersburg on 24 June 2021. Moissieva's funeral took place at the Church of the Theotokos of Smolensk on 29 June 2021 and was buried at Smolensky Cemetery in Saint Petersburg.

== Recognition ==
She was awarded for her professional work by the state. She won first prize at the 3rd World Festival of Youth and Students in East Berlin, East Germany in 1951. In 1955, Moissieva was presented with the honorary title of Honored Artist of the RSFSR, and the 1971 television concert film Olga Moiseyeva Dances was dedicated to her. She was awarded the title of People's Artist of the RSFSR in 1973 and the People's Artist of the USSR in 1983. Moissieva was presented with the highest theatre award of Saint Petersburg, the Golden Soffit in 2007, "for creative longevity and a unique contribution to the theatrical culture of St. Petersburg". She was awarded the Order of Friendship in 2008.
