= Kevin Martin =

Kevin Martin may refer to:

== Sports ==
- Kevin Martin (basketball, born 1983), American former professional basketball player in NBA
- Kevin Martin (basketball, born 1975), American former professional basketball player in Finland
- Kevin Martin (boxer) (1925–1983), Irish Olympic boxer
- Kevin Martin (curler) (born 1966), Canadian curler
- Kevin Martin (hurler) (born 1973), Irish hurler, plays for Tullamore and Offaly
- Kevin Martin (footballer) (born 1995), Swiss footballer

== Others ==
- Kevin Martin (American musician) (born 1969), singer of Candlebox and The Gracious Few
- Kevin Martin (British musician), of God, Techno Animal, and The Bug
- Kevin Martin (lawyer) (born 1966), former chair of the U.S. Federal Communications Commission
- Kevin Martin (dancer), American dancer and ballet teacher
