= John Barker (ballet) =

American dancer, ballet teacher, and translator (1929–2020)

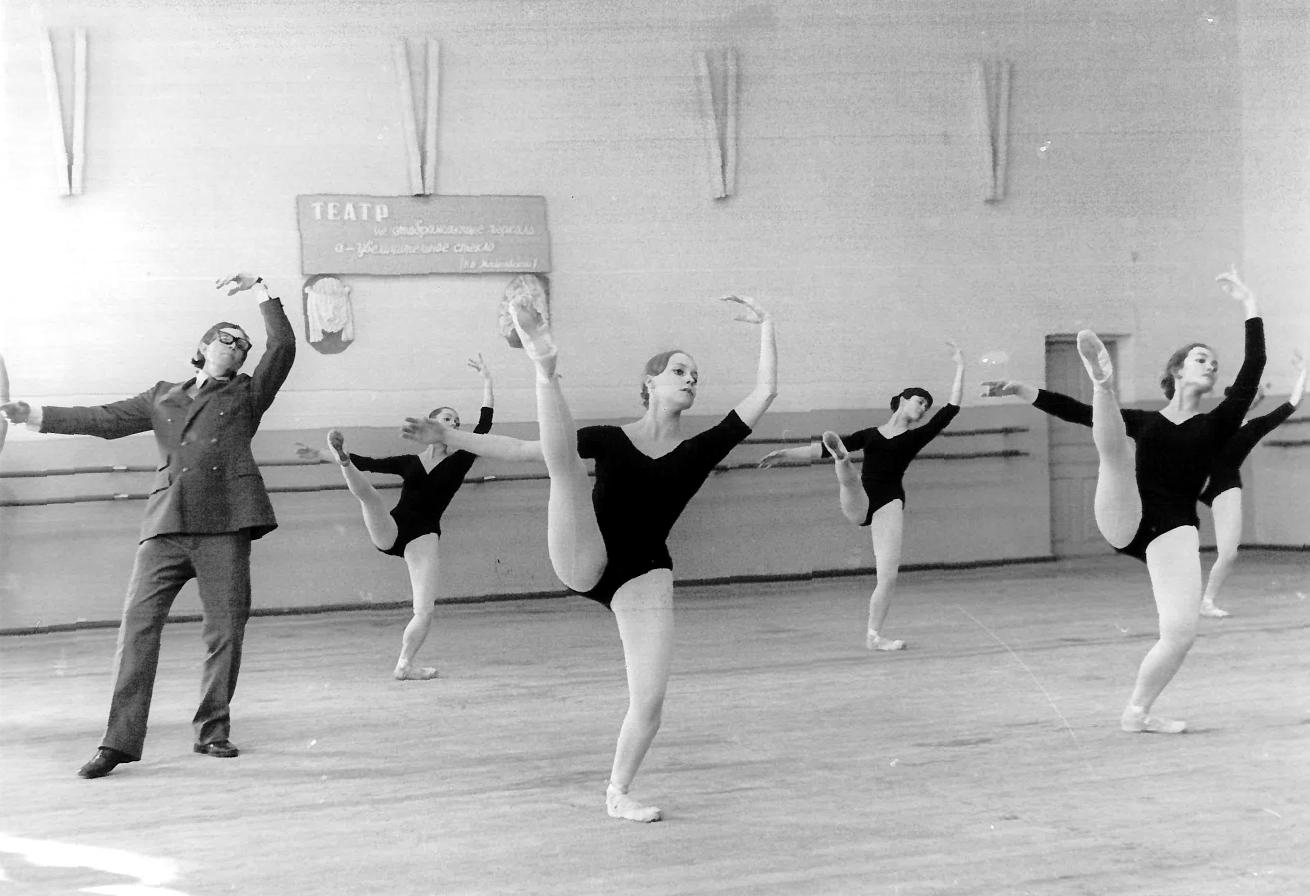
- John Barker teaching développé ballotté effacé devant at the Tashkent Choreographic School in Tashkent, Uzebekistan, circa 1972.
- Born: John William Barker; November 20, 1929; Oak Park, Illinois, U.S.
- Died: April 7, 2020; Queens, New York, US
- Occupations: dancer, ballet pedagogue, expert in the Soviet method of teaching Classical Dance

John Barker was an American dancer, ballet teacher and translator. He was a leading authority in the West on the Soviet method of teaching classical dance, and the first American to be allowed to teach the method in Russia. He was the official translator, into English, of the textbook of the Leningrad Choreographic School (the Vaganova Academy).

== Career ==
John Barker was a dancer with the Page-Stone Camryn Company, the Chicago Opera Ballet, and the Jose Limon Company. From 1955 to 1956, he danced with the Juilliard Dance Theater. He also danced with the American Ballet Theatre, in numerous summer stock performances of musicals.

Barker ended his career in dance after suffering from several injuries. With the advice from a friend, he started teaching.

In the 1960s, he opened his own ballet school, the John Barker School of Classical Ballet, located at 154 W 56th Street in New York City, across from Carnegie Hall. When he first started teaching, Barker felt that what he was doing was "primitive" and felt that "there must be some better way" of teaching ballet. In 1967, Barker attended a ballet lesson taught by the Russian ballet master, Alexander Ivanovich Pushkin, where he admitted that watching the class made him want to "learn Russian to speak with him and learn from him how to become a better teacher."

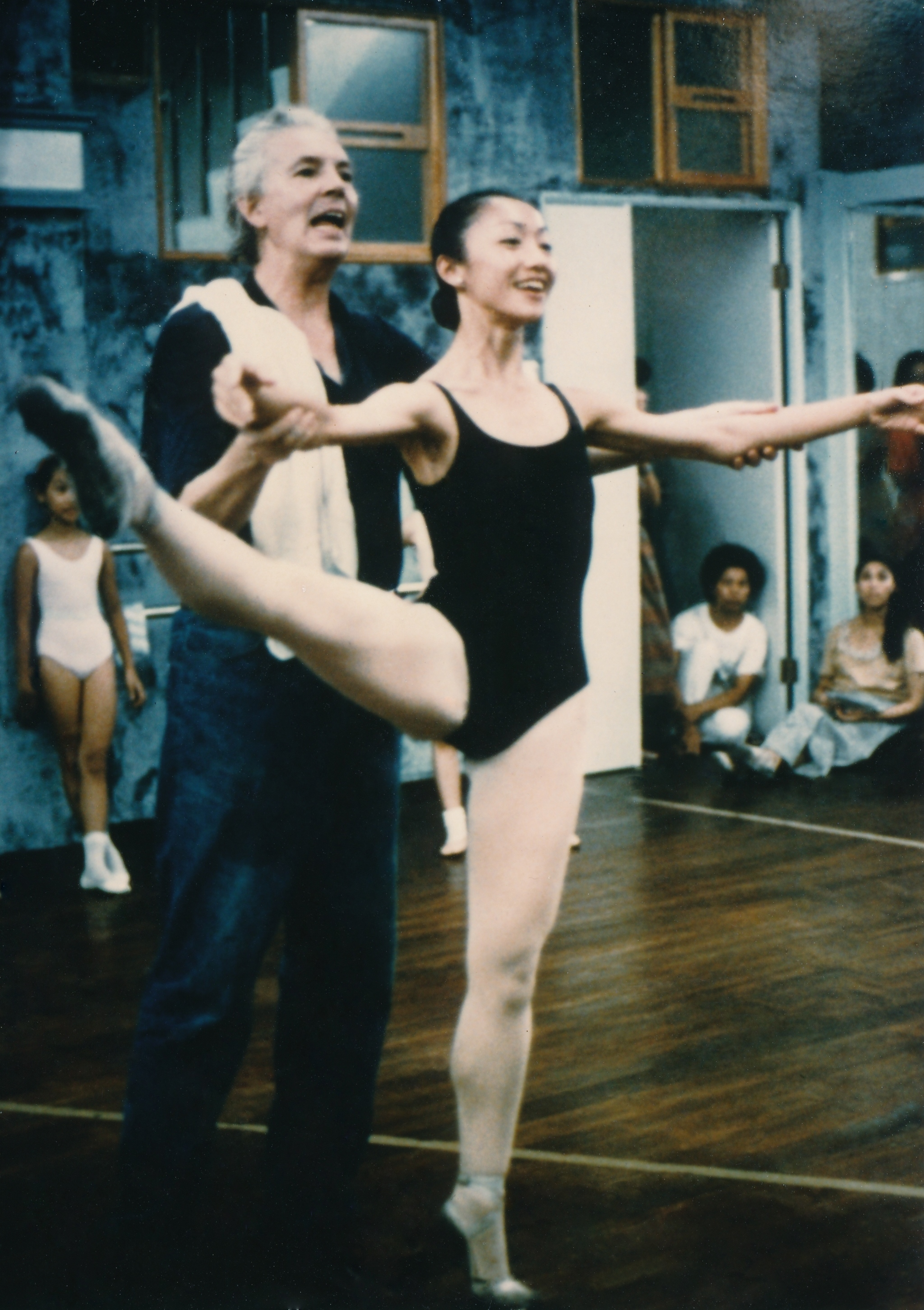
John Barker teaching at the Su Jee Ballet School in Taipei, Taiwan

Barker learned from Anatole Chujoy, a renowned dance critic and historian, that this method of teaching ballet was only to be found in Russia, and that there were books on teaching the method but that they were all in Russian. Subsequently, Chujoy put Barker in touch with Natalia Roslavleva, a leading Soviet dance historian, who sent him six lessons of Asaf Messerer. Barker stated that he "bought a book for 95 cents - How to Teach yourself Russian," and he started to learn Russian.

Barker studied and collaborated for many years with Vera Kostrovitskaya, who was Agrippina Vaganova's assistant. He translated from Russian to English the School of Classical Dance : the textbook of the Vaganova Choreographic School, Leningrad, USSR, written by Vera Kostrovitskaya and Alexei Pisarev. He also translated and published in the U.S., 101 classical dance lessons : from the first through the eighth year of study : with forty-eight lessons on pointe written by Vera Kostrovitskaya. Barker also wrote and published a ballet bulletin, Soubresaut. Barker taught the Vaganova Choreographic School's ballet Teaching Method—as described in the two works: School of Classical Dance and 101 Classical Dance Lessons—to pedagogical students at his own school, as well as travelling to other locations to teach the method. Among them, the Scapino Ballet School in Amsterdam.

After closing his school, Barker was a consultant and a guest teacher worldwide. He was a guest teacher at the Su Jee Ballet School in Taiwan and the Irish National Ballet.

== Early life ==
Barker was born November 20, 1929, in Oak Park, Illinois. His parents were Charles Munting Barker and Frances Banthin. He had three siblings, Charles, Bruce, and Cathy. His grandfather, John William Barker, and namesake, was a prominent citizen in Maywood, Illinois after arriving from England in the 1880s.

Barker graduated from the Oak Park and River Forest High School in Oak Park Illinois in 1948. He studied ballet as a scholarship student at the Stone-Camryn School in Chicago. He later studied ballet at the School of American Ballet in New York.

He began to study anthropology in the fall of 1954 at the University of Chicago, but discontinued his studies after completing the Spring semester, 1955, in order to join the Chicago Opera Ballet, and begin his career in dance. He was a PFC in the US ARMY/KOREA.

== Death ==
Barker died April 7, 2020, of undisclosed causes in New York. He is buried at the Calverton National Cemetery, in Calverton, New York.

== Students ==
John Barker taught ballet pedagogy to teachers, as well as teaching students ballet. Some of his pedagogical students include: Janet L. Springer, Willard Hall, Peggy Willis-Aarnio, Sharon Dante, Howard Epstein, Cathy Longinotti, Lynda Gooding Nelson, Gretchen Warren Ward, and John White.

Some of his ballet students include, Kevin Martin, who Barker took to the Moscow Ballet Competition in 1981, Jeff Szuhay, and Linda Williams.
