= Yulia Makhalina =

Russian ballet dancer (born 1968)

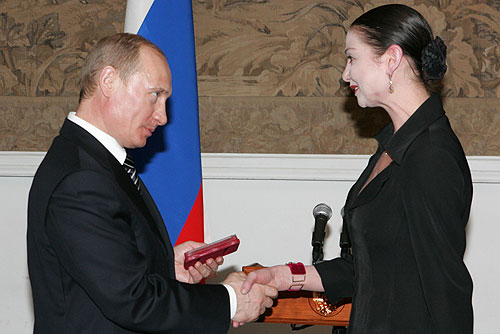
Yulia Makhalina receiving an award from Vladimir Putin

Yulia Victorovna Makhalina (Russian: Юлия Викторовна Махалина), also Yulia, (born 23 June 1968) is a Russian ballet dancer. Since 1986, she has been with the Kirov/Mariinsky Ballet where she is a principal dancer. Along with Ulyana Lopatkina, Makhalina is a member of 'the basketball team', a group of Kirov dancers who are characterized for being especially tall and slender.

== Biography ==
Born in Leningrad, she trained under Marina A. Vasilieva at the Vaganova Academy of Russian Ballet, graduating in 1985. Her father, Viktor Makhalin, is an engineer and her mother Anna is an accountant. Makhalina's teachers at the academy reportedly told her she would be only a corps de ballet dancer and after graduation she had signed on with a company in Lvov, but she was accepted into the Kirov after attracting the notice of then artistic director Oleg Vinogradov.

Makhalina danced the leading role of Medora in Le Corsaire during her first season with the company. She was approached by Gennady Schreiber to learn the lead role in Swan Lake during her first year with the company, which was an unusual offer for an inexperienced dancer. Olga Moiseeva, who was renowned for her interpretation of the white swan Odette coached Makhalina for the part. She was often partnered in this ballet by Andris Liepa. In 1990, her interpretation of Odette-Odile with partner Igor Zelensky was filmed at the Mariinsky Theater.

A member of the Mariinsky Ballet since 1986, she has performed the leading roles in Swan Lake, Sleeping Beauty, Le Corsaire and Anna Karenina. Her repertoire has included the major classical ballets as well as works choreographed by George Balanchine including Theme and Variations, Scotch Symphony, Apollo, The Prodigal Son and Symphony in C. Makhalina's role debuts with the Kirov/Mariinsky included Myrtha (1986) and the title role (1991) in Giselle, Medora (1987) in Le Corsaire, Odette/Odile (1987) in Swan Lake, Gamzatti (1988) and Nikiya (1990) in La Bayadère, Kitri (1989) in Don Quixote, Lilac Fairy (1989) in Sleeping Beauty, title role (1994) in Raymonda, and Countess of Elba (1996) in Goya Divertissement. She has also performed the title roles in Roland Petit's Carmen and in Kenneth MacMillan's Manon. Exotic roles have included Zobeide in Scheherazade and Death in The Youth and Death, while supporting roles have included the evil stepmother in Cinderella. She has also performed as a soloist at the Royal Danish Ballet, Berlin's Deutsche Oper, the Teatro Colón in Buenos Aires and at the Paris Opera. In Moscow's Bolshoi Theatre, she has danced in Swan Lake, La Bayadère and The Firebird. In 2014, it was announced that Makhalina would return to Montreal's "Gala des Étoiles du ballet russe", known as "Don des Étoiles" in 1988 when she first appeared at the event. With a repertoire of 40 roles, Makhalina also has outside interests in areas such as architecture and nature.

== Reviews ==
After a 1989 performance as Myrtha, the Queen of the Wilis in the ballet blanc scene of the Romantic ballet Giselle, a review published in New York Magazine described her as having "extraordinarily long limbs" and a "calm, majestic command" over her body while performing slower movements, but noted that her phrasing became "disconnected" while performing big leaps or petit allegro combinations that require fast footwork. That same year The Washington Post published a review praising her "voluptuous melancholy" in the White Swan Adagio excerpt from the second act of Swan Lake.

During the Kirov Ballet's 1992 performance of Swan Lake at the Metropolitan Opera House in New York City, a reviewer for The New Leader wrote: "Although Makhalina is impressive standing still, when she moves one can see what she is missing: liberty. She has 'plastique' but lacks pulse and impulse; each step is labored, exact to a fault."

Makhalina received a positive review from New York Magazine in 1995 for her performance as Zobeide in Mikhail Fokine's Scheherazade. Dance critic Tobi Tobias wrote that "what was most endearing was her willing participation in a tale that, to a contemporary audience, is likely to seem ludicrously primitive and overblown".

Nina Alovert, a well known ballet photographer and writer, wrote that she first took note of Makhalina in 1987 during a performance of Paquita writing that Makhalina "immediately stood out among several young dancers with her 180-degree extension", noting also her "soft landing" during jumps. Like other reviewers, she also noted Makhalina's "physical beauty".

== Awards ==
Yulia Makhalina has won many prestigious awards including:

- 1990: Gold Medal, Paris International Ballet Competition
- 1998: Prix Benois de la Danse
- 2008: People's Artist of Russia
