= Altynai Asylmuratova =

Kazakh-born ballerina, teacher, and artistic director

- Алтынай Асылмұратова
- Born: Altynai Abduakhimkyzy Asylmuratova; 1 January 1961 (age 65); Almaty, Kazakh SSR, Soviet Union
- Occupations: Ballerina (1978–2000), ballet teacher (2000–present)
- Years active: 1978–2000
- Spouse: Konstantin Zaklinsky
- Children: Anastasia Zaklinskaya (b. 1993)

Altynai Abduakhimkyzy Asylmuratova (Kazakh: Алтынай Абдуахимқызы Асылмұратова, Altynai Abduahimqyzy Asylmūratova; born 1 January 1961) is a Kazakh-born former ballerina who is artistic director of the ballet company at Astana Opera. She is a former prima ballerina with the Kirov Ballet and a guest artist all over the world.

== Biography ==
=== Early life ===
Altynai Asylmuratova was born in Almaty, Kazakhstan into a theatrical family: the lives of her parents and grandparents were associated with ballet. Altynai Asylmuratova's parents were graduates of the Leningrad Choreographic School. Her father, Abduakhim Asylmuratov, honored Artist of the Kazakh SSR, was a soloist of the Abay Opera House, after – the artistic director of the Almaty choreographic school. Her grandfather was the chief choreographer of the Kazakh National Conservatory, and her paternal great-grandfather was a deputy of the Russian State Duma of the first convocation.

Her mother, Galina Sidorova, was originally from Leningrad, where her parents danced on the stage in the 1920s and 30s. After graduating from college, Galina Sidorova married a military man, during World War II on the Eastern Front. Together with Galina Sidorova's parents, Galina was evacuated to Almaty. There Galina began to dance in the ballet troupe of the Abay Opera House and, having divorced her first husband, married Abduakhim Asylmuratov. After the end of the war, Galina Sidorova stayed in Almaty, where Altynai was born.

Altynai spent her childhood behind the scenes of the theater. She loved to dance, but her mother, knowing the difficulties of the profession, did not want to send her child to a ballet school. Altynai was sent to Leningrad for the entrance exams to the Leningrad Choreographic School only thanks to the persistence of her grandmother and grandfather.

== Ballet career ==
Asylmuratova graduated in 1978 in the class of Inna Zubkovskaya, after which she was accepted into the corps de ballet of the Kirov State Academic Theatre of Opera and Ballet. From 1980 to 1999, Asylmuratova was a soloist of this theater, and was also a prima ballerina from 1987 to 1999. She worked with teacher/tutor Olga Moiseeva. Asylmuratova was also a soloist of the Royal Ballet from 1989 to 1993.

Asylmuratova became more popular in Western theaters than in those of her home country due to her frequent guest appearances abroad, including Roland Petit's company. She was much admired both for her looks and the beauty of her dancing. Her repertoire included all the classical ballet rôles in Swan Lake, The Sleeping Beauty, Giselle, Don Quixote, and La Bayadère, Mikhail Fokine pieces such as The Firebird and Les Sylphides, as well as modern classics like Romeo and Juliet, works by choreographer George Balanchine and Roland Petit. Among Asylmuratova's partners were dancers Konstantin Zaklinsky, Farukh Ruzimatov, Evgenii Neff, Igor Zelensky, Makhar Vaziev (in St. Petersburg), Irek Mukhamedov (in London), and Jan Brex (in Marseille).

Videos of her dancing in Le Corsaire, La Bayadère, Les Sylphides, and The Sleeping Beauty are available. In addition, Asylmuratova was the subject of a 1982 documentary Backstage at the Kirov which followed her as she prepared to dance the lead in Swan Lake.

In 1999, she received the St. Petersburg theater award "Golden Sofit" for her performance of the title role in the ballet Carmen, staged at the Mariinsky Theater. In the same year, at the peak of her career, Asylmuratova left the stage and took up teaching at her alma mater, the Vaganova Academy of Russian Ballet.

In 2000 she was appointed artistic director of the Vaganova Academy.

In 2002 and again in 2012, she was a juror of Benois de la Danse. In 2003, she was a juror of the international competition Le Prix de Lausanne (Switzerland), and was repeatedly a juror of the Dance Open (St. Petersburg).

In 2013, Asylmuratova was forced to resign from her position at Vaganova after the new rector, Nikolai Tsiskaridze, was appointed by the Ministry of Culture. She was immediately invited to work at the Mikhailovsky Theater, where from 13 December 2013 to March 2014, she was an adviser to the General Director for ballet. In 2015, Asylmuratova became artistic director of ballet at Astana Opera, Kazakhstan. In 2016 Nursultan Nazarbaev hired her as rector of the Kazakhstan Academy of Choreography.

== Creative work ==
=== Repertoire ===
==== Mariinsky Theatre ====
- Fairy Lilac, Fairy of Courage, Princess Aurora, "The Sleeping Beauty" by Marius Petipa edited by Konstantin Sergeyev
- 1984 – Asiyat*, "Asiyat" by Oleg Vinogradov
- 1988 – Mary Magdalene*, "Try" by A. Fodor to music of Presser Gábor
- Soloist*, "Theme and Variations" by George Balanchine
- 18 March 1992 – 1st duet, "In the Night" by Jerome Robbins (partner – Konstantin Zaklinsky)
- 28 January 1992 – "Leaves Are Fading" by Antony Tudor
- Manon*, "Manon" by Kenneth MacMillan
- 1998 – "Carmen" by Roland Petit (Don José – Islom Baimuradov)
- Odette and Odile, "Swan Lake" by Marius Petipa and Lev Ivanov edited by Konstantin Sergeyev
- Shirin, Mehmene Banu, "The Legend of Love" by Yury Grigorovich
- Kitri, "Don Quixote" by Marius Petipa edited by Alexander Gorsky (Marat Daukaev)
- Nikiya, "La Bayadère", by Marius Petipa edited by Vladimir Ponomaryov and Vakhtang Chabukiani
- Aegina, "Spartacus" by Yury Grigorovich
- Medora, "Le Corsaire" by Marius Petipa edited by Pyotr Gusev
- Zarema, "Bakhchisarai fountain" by Rostislav Zakharov
- Juliet, "Romeo and Juliet" by Leonid Lavrovsky
- The Sylph, "La Sylphide" by August Bournonville edited by Elsa-Marianne von Rosen
- Masha, "The Nutcracker" by Vasili Vainonen
- Terpsichore, "Apollo" by George Balanchine
- Zobeida, "Scheherazade" by Michel Fokine
- Clémence, (Henrietta?), Raymonda "Raymonda" by Marius Petipa edited by Konstantin Sergeyev
- Mazurka, 7th walth, "Les Sylphides" by Michel Fokine
- Nestan-Darejan, "The Knight in the Panther's Skin" by Oleg Vinogradov
- pas de deux in act I, Giselle, "Giselle" by Jean Coralli and Jules Perrot, edited by Marius Petipa
- Persian, dance of the Persians in the opera, "Khovanshchina"
- "Pas de quatre" by Anton Dolin
- "Le cygne" by Michel Fokine
- "The Ghost Dance" by Dmitry Bryantsev

==== The Royal Ballet ====
- Giselle, "Giselle"
- Odette and Odile, "Swan Lake"
- Nikiya, "La Bayadère" edited by Natalia Makarova
- Raymonda, "Raymonda" edited by Rudolf Nureyev
- Natalia Petrovna, "Month in the village" by Frederick Ashton
- Manon, "L'histoire de Manon" by Kenneth MacMillan
- Juliet, "Romeo and Juliet" by Kenneth MacMillan

==== Paris Opera ====
- Nikiya, "La Bayadère" edited by Rudolf Nureyev
- Odette and Odile, "Swan Lake" edited by Rudolf Nureyev

==== Ballet National de Marseille ====
- Swanilda, "Coppélia"
- Carmen, "Carmen"
- "Cheri", music by Francis Poulenc
- "L'Arlésienne"
- "Chaplin danse avec nous"
- "Guépard"
- "Ma Pavlova"

=== Filmography ===
- 1978 – "Snow in the mourning", episode, hindu girl
- 1982 – Backstage at the Kirov, documentary "Black snow"
- 1988 – Cleopatra, "Egyptian nights"
- 1988 – Eva, "Grand Pas on a White Night" (duet from the ballet of Maurice Béjart "Heliogabale", Adam – Farukh Ruzimatov)

== Recognition ==
- 1983 – Honored Artist of the RSFSR
- 1998 – laureate of the theater prize "Baltika"
- 1999 – laureate of the theater prize "Golden Soffit" (for the performance of the role of Carmen in the ballet by Roland Petit)
- 2001 – People's Artist of Russia
- 2001 – laureate of the State Prize of the Russian Federation in the field of literature and art
- 2013 – Order of Friendship (15 November 2013) – for great services in the development of national culture and art, many years of fruitful activity
- 2016 – Order of Parasat (Kazakhstan)
- 2020 – Jubilee medal "25 years of the Constitution of Kazakhstan"
