= Alexander Pushkin (ballet dancer) =

Russian ballet dancer and master (1907–1970)

- Pushkin (right) with Rudolf Nureyev (left)
- Born: Alexander Ivanovich Pushkin; 7 September 1907; Mikulino (Moscow Oblast)
- Died: 20 March 1970 (aged 62); Leningrad
- Occupations: ballet dancer, choreographer, ballet teacher

Alexander Ivanovich Pushkin (Russian: Алекса́ндр Ива́нович Пу́шкин; 7 September 1907 – 20 March 1970) was a Russian ballet dancer and ballet master. His students include Askold Makarov, Nikita Dolgushin, Oleg Vinogradov, Rudolf Nureyev, Margarita Trayanova, Mikhail Baryshnikov and Sergei Berezhnoy.

Pushkin's movement system was based on the experience of musical theater. This system of movement arose from folk, social, and other forms of dance. It is this system that is associated with the concepts of "Russian" and "classical" ballet.
