= St Petersburg Ballet Theatre =

Russian classical ballet company

The St Petersburg Ballet Theatre (SPBT) is a Russian classical ballet company. It was founded in 1994 by Konstantin Tachkin, who has continued to direct the company over its 25-year history. The St Petersburg Ballet Theatre is housed in a complex on Liteyniy prospect, situated in the heart of Saint-Petersburg, which in Imperial Russia had served as the House of Officers.

== History ==
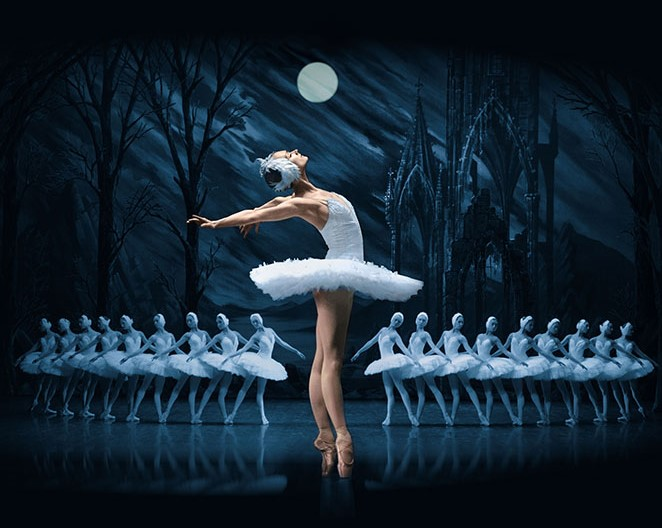
St Petersburg Ballet Theatre

Although the company performs frequently in its home city and throughout Russia it also has a reputation for its international touring. The company’s sixty professional ballet artists are all either graduates of the Vaganova Ballet Academy in St Petersburg or from one of several other Russian ballet schools.

== Irina Kolesnikova ==
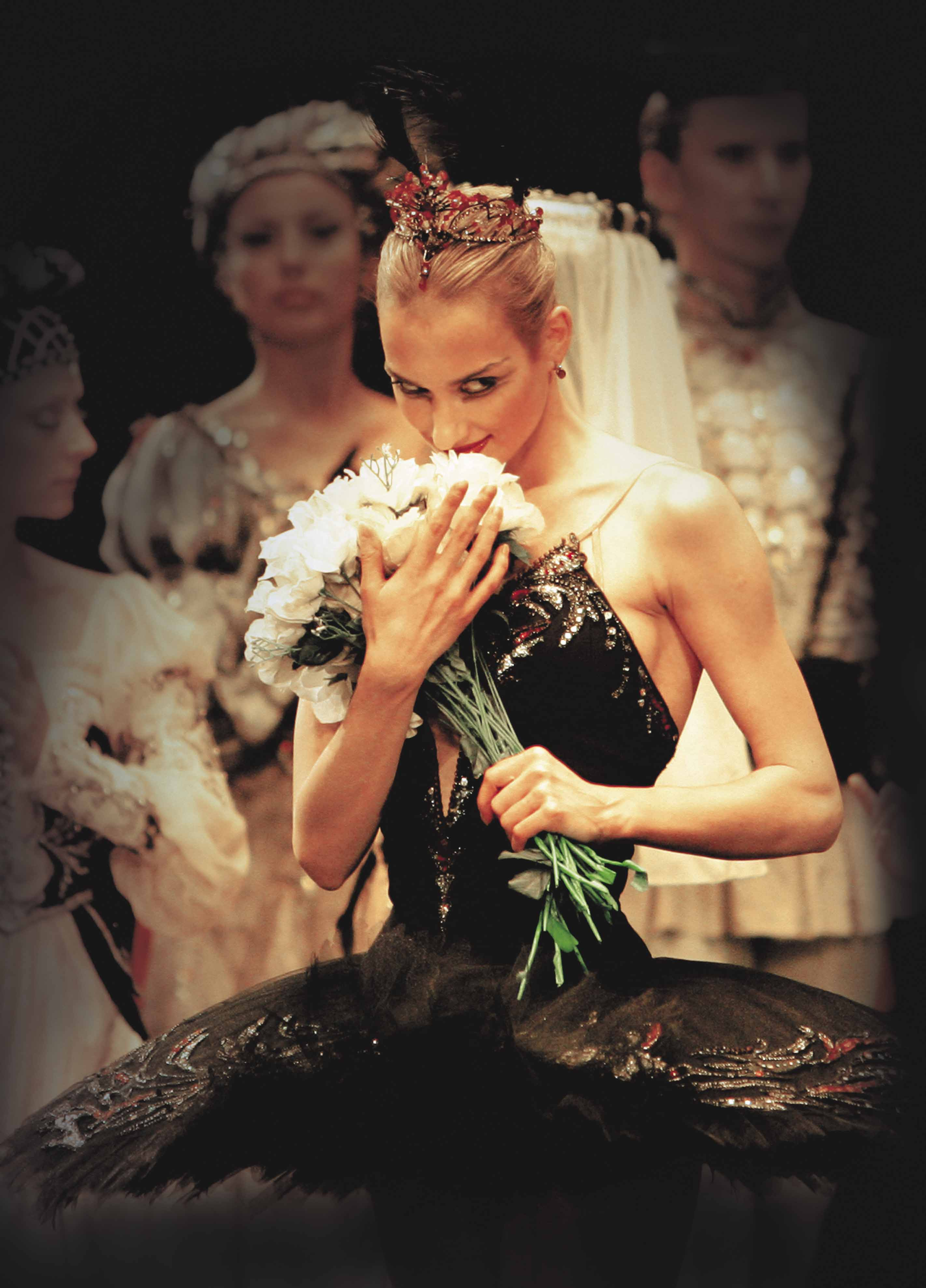
Irina Kolesnikova, prima ballerina of the St Petersburg Ballet Theatre

Irina Kolesnikova is the Principal dancer of the St Petersburg Ballet Theatre.

Reviews include:

“..the overall pure joy of Kolesnikova’s interpretation is not only a true reflection of some of the most beautiful and evocative music Tchaikovsky ever wrote but an affirmation of the power and joy of dance” — Jeffery Taylor, The Sunday Express, UK

“Kolesnikova is a real artist whose gifts include expressive arms, a pliant torso and a meltingly slow, expansive yet detailed style that draws us right to her...Kolesnikova is a dream of an Odette.” — Donald Hutera, The Times, UK

“Irina Kolesnikova looks like a princess straight out of Russian fairy tales..This is the first time that the mastery of Russian ballet is being represented not by the ballerinas of the Bolshoi or the Kirov, but by a star from an independent company” — Nina Alovert, Dance Magazine, US

== Théâtre des Champs-Élysées ==
In 2018, St Petersburg Ballet Theatre (SPBT) celebrated the 10th anniversary of Irina Kolesnikova's annual Parisian seasons.

During this time, in addition to with world’s favourite Swan Lake the other masterpieces of world choreography were presented to the Parisian public, such as:

- Don Quixote (2009, 2016)
- Giselle (2009, 2017)
- La Bayadère (2009, 2015)
- The Nutcracker (2011)
- Sleeping Beauty (2011)
- St Petersburg’s Nutcracker (2013, 2016)
- Romeo and Juliet (2014, 2015)
- Chopiniana and Paquita (2018)

== Performances ==
- Swan Lake
- Giselle
- La Bayadère
- The Nutcracker
- Don Quixote
- Romeo and Juliet
- The Sleeping Beauty
