= Sheila Willis Kleiman =

American ballet dancer, choreographer, and artistic director

- Born: Sheila Maureen Willis; February 26, 1950 (age 76); Middlesboro, Kentucky
- Other names: Sheila Hart, Sheila Willis Hart, Sheila Hart Kleiman
- Occupations: Classical ballet dancer, modern dancer, choreographer, ballet teacher and interior designer
- Spouse: Morris C. Kleiman
- Children: Jeremy

Sheila Willis (Hart) Kleiman (born February 26, 1950) is an American ballet teacher, ballet dancer, modern dancer, choreographer, interior designer and subject matter expert of classical ballet. She is the founder and president of the Performing Arts Cultural Exchange, a nonprofit 501(c)3 foundation (PACEBALLET.ORG) which is dedicated to providing teacher training, teaching scholarships and ballet scholarships to students world-wide. The foundation was started to honor her sister, Peggy Willis-Aarnio's legacy and life work for pedagogical ballet training of teachers. The International Classic Ballet Theatre of Marina Medvetskaya is a subsidiary of PACEBALLET.ORG and Tours the United States, United Kingdom and Europe on a regular basis.

== Early life ==
Kleiman was born in Middlesboro, Bell County, Kentucky. Her mother, Margaret Maria Spangler was a musician and professional model. Her step-father, Walter H. Dozier, CWO Warrant 4, was a naval officer and the chief pay clerk for NATO. Her family moved to Naples, Italy, where her mother enrolled Sheila, and her sister Peggy, in ballet lessons. The family returned to the United States in 1958 and settled in Panama City Beach, Florida after her father, Walter Dozier had completed an accompanied tour with the USN 6th Fleet. In Panama City, Kleiman continued her ballet studies with John & Virginia Sweet, at the Virginia Sweet School of Dance. In 1967, while still in high school, Sheila was a semifinalist in the Sweet Heart of the Beach contest. In 1968, she was second runner-up and won first place in talent in the Miss Panama City Beauty contest where she danced Espana - an original ballet choreographed by her sister Peggy. It was the first of many collaborations. Sheila graduated from Bay High School in Panama City Florida in 1968.

After her high school graduation, Kleiman began studying at Texas Christian University, where she received the TCU Fine Arts Guild Scholarship from the TCU Music Department. She graduated from Texas Christian University in 1972 with a Bachelor of Fine Arts in ballet and a minor in Theatre Arts.

For three summers, while on vacation from her studies at Texas Christian University, Sheila, and her sister Peggy Willis-Aarnio were hired as performers at Mr. Koplin's Tombstone Territory on Panama City Beach, where at age 21, Kleiman choreographed her first dances.

== Career ==
Kleiman began her ballet career as soloist with both the Ft. Worth Ballet and with the TCU Ballet Division Company. Both companies were directed at the time by Fernando Schaffenburg, who was the head of the ballet program at Texas Christian University.

After graduating from Texas Christian University, she joined the Cobb Marietta Ballet, (currently the Georgia Ballet) as a soloist and was assistant director from 1973 to 1978, under Iris Hensley. She was a performing member of Italia Musica de Arti tour of Italy, where she performed in over 20 cities throughout the Abruzzi region of Italy. When she returned to the U.S., Kleiman moved to Tallahassee, Florida, and worked with the Tallahassee Civic Ballet. In 1979, Sheila joined the Pittsburgh Dance Alloy as a soloist, choreographer, and co-director of the Alloy training school. She also continued to perform and tour with various modern and ballet companies. Kleiman was a guest artist and guest teacher with Texas Tech University. She also performed in the PBS production of Dracula, the Ballet as the lead role, Leiselle.

Kleiman studied and prepared for a second career in design while she was living in Pittsburgh, and earned an associate degree in Interior Design from the Art Institute of Pittsburgh.

Kleiman is currently the president of the Performing Arts Cultural Exchange, which she founded in 2018, which is dedicated to the "preservation of the teaching method founded by the Vaganova School of Classical Dance."
