= Oleg Vinogradov =

Russian choreographer and educator (born 1937)

- Олег Виноградов
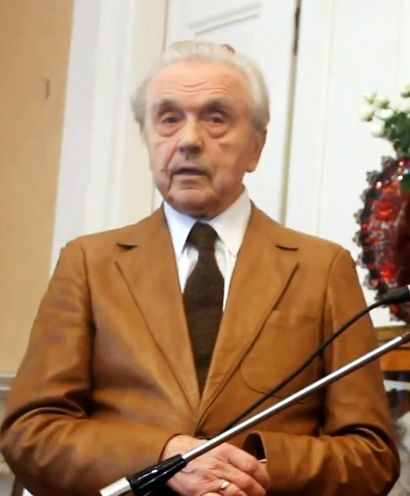
- Vinogradov in 2018
- Born: 1 August 1937 (age 89)
- Education: Leningrad Choreographic School
- Occupations: Dancer, choreographer, artistic director
- Organization(s): Kirov Ballet, Mikhailovsky Theatre, Kirov Ballet School, Universal Ballet (Seoul)
- Notable work: Staging Cinderella (1964), Romeo and Juliet (1965), Asel (1967), Goryanka (1968), Giselle (1977)

Oleg Mikhailovich Vinogradov (Russian: Оле́г Миха́йлович Виногра́дов; born 1 August 1937) is a Russian former dancer, choreographer and ballet director. He graduated from the Vaganova Academy of Russian Ballet under Alexander Ivanovich Pushkin and went on to become a choreographer, working with some of the Soviet Union's most important ballet companies, including the Kirov Ballet and the Bolshoi Ballet. In the early 1970s he was artistic director and chief choreographer at the Maly Theatre Ballet, and became artistic director of the Kirov Ballet in 1977. During this period, relations between the Soviet Union and the United States grew warmer, and the Kirov Ballet embarked on several US tours for the first time in decades. Vinogradov became the first Soviet ballet master to invite Maurice Béjart and Roland Petit to stage works for the Kirov, and also helped to bring authorized productions of George Balanchine's ballets to Russia for the first time. He was named a People's Artist of the USSR in 1983.

== Early career ==
Oleg Vinogradov was born in Leningrad on 1 August 1937. At the age of 20 he graduated from the Vaganova Academy of Russian Ballet, then called the Leningrad Choreographic School, where he studied under Aleksandr Pushkin. Between 1958 and 1965, Vinogradov was a character dancer with a company in Novosibirsk. He later began choreographing short ballet scenes for operas. He staged several ballets as an assistant ballet master to Pyotr Gusev, including Prokofiev's Cinderella and Romeo and Juliet in 1964 and 1965 respectively.

His first two stagings of classic Prokofiev ballets were well received in Russia and he was invited to stage two productions for Russia's largest ballet companies: the Bolshoi Ballet and the Kirov Ballet. In 1967, he staged a relatively unknown ballet called Asel, with music by Vladimir Vlasov, for the Bolshoi, and in 1968 he staged Goryanka for the Kirov. He received a position with the Kirov as a choreographer and in 1973 he became the artistic director and chief choreographer of the Maly Theatre Ballet.

== Artistic director of Kirov Ballet ==
When Vinogradov became artistic director of the Kirov Ballet in 1977, he fired over half the dancers at the company, and hired younger dancers. Also in 1977, Vinogradov restaged Adam's Giselle. He said he tried to "return to Petipa's original conception, and to remove the numerous superfluous elements and distortions that have crept in". He worked on this ballet with Soviet historian Yuri Slonimsky who, according to Vinogradov, had access to Petipa's original scores which he says made it possible to "rectify many mistakes".

In 1986 the company performed in the United States for the first time in 22 years, during a period of thawing relations between the US and Soviet Union. Natalia Makarova, who had defected from the Kirov in 1970, was allowed to dance with the Russian company again, and Russian dancers were able to make appearances with leading companies in the United States. Under Mikhail Gorbachev's relaxed policies, Vinogradov could make independent decisions about the company's repertoire (in the past the repertoire had to be approved by a committee). The company toured with only 39 dancers in 1987, performing excerpts rather than full-length ballets. The choreographers represented on this tour included Boris Eifmann, Dmitry Bryantsev and an excerpt from Béjart's Notre Faust.

During their 1989 tour of the United States, the Kirov performed a wide range of classical and contemporary works including Le Corsaire, Tchaikovsky's The Sleeping Beauty, and Paquita (with music by Ludwig Minkus). They also performed an original ballet by Vinogradov called Battleship Potemkin and two ballets choreographed by George Balanchine: Scotch Symphony and Theme and Variations.

The Kirov Ballet had never performed any Balanchine ballets prior to 1989. The Balanchine Trust only allows Balanchine's works to be performed when the staging is supervised by a ballet master who has been trained in the "Balanchine style". Vinogradov helped bring authorized productions of Balanchine's ballets to Russia for the first time.

Vinogradov also became the first Soviet ballet master to invite Maurice Béjart and Roland Petit to stage works for the Kirov. In 1991, the Washington Post wrote that the company had begun to "free itself of its Communist shackles" and "open its doors to Western artists and influences".

Regarding the challenges that Antony Tudor's choreography had presented for the Russian ballet dancers, Vinogradov said that "Tudor is more difficult for our dancers than even Balanchine. ... Tudor's plastic, impulsive, off-balance approach to the upper torso, head and arms is more problematic for us." He remarked that he had been particularly impressed by Lupe Serrano's dancing in Tudor's Lilac Garden".

By 1991 the company roster had declined from 21 principal dancers to only 10, and several well-known dancers were no longer dancing with the company, including Farukh Ruzimatov, Galina Mezentseva and Yelena Pankova. When the Kirov toured the US that year Andris Liepa, Veronika Ivanova and Igor Zelensky were among the new additions to the company's ranks.

== The Kirov Academy of Ballet ==
The Kirov Academy of Ballet, formerly called the Universal Ballet Academy (UBA), opened in Washington DC in 1990. The Gorbachov era policy of glasnost made it possible for Vinogradov to retain his position as artistic director of the Kirov Ballet in Russia, and also spend four months per year in the United States to serve as director of UBA. Though not a teacher at the school himself, Vinogradov appointed four Russian teachers to teach a curriculum based on the Russian Vaganova syllabus: Ludmila Sakharova, Nikolai Morozov, Ludmilla Morkovina and Azari Plissetski.

== Post-Kirov ==
Vinogradov's style of directorship proved controversial and in 1997 Valery Gergiev took over directorship of the ballet theatre. In 1998 Vinogradov became director of the Universal Ballet in Seoul, as well as the Kirov Ballet School in Washington DC, and he has staged some productions such as La Fille mal gardée for the Stanislavsky Ballet. He left Seoul Ballet in 2008 to join the Mikhailovsky Ballet as an associate choreographer.

== Recent years ==
Vinogradov continues to teach and choreograph. He has been a guest teacher and choreographer at the International Youth Ballet Festival, in conjunction with Classical Dance Alliance, run by ballet pedagogue, Janet L Springer.
