= Nina Alovert =

American photographer

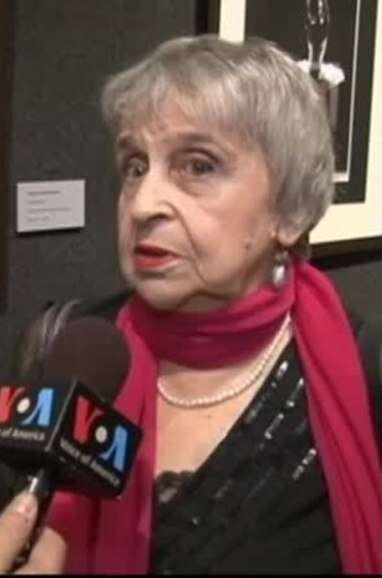
- Alovert in 1982
- Born: 1935 (age 90–91); Leningrad, Russia
- Occupations: Photographer and writer for Dance Magazine and Ballet Review

Nina Nikolaevna Alovert (Russian: Нина Николаевна Аловерт; born 1935) is a ballet photographer and writer. She lives in the United States, following her emigration from the Soviet Union in 1977.

Alovert was the photographer for the 1986 Emmy Award-winning program Wolf Trapp Presents the Kirov Swan Lake. She won an international ballet prize in 2003, the Prix Benois de la Danse "Diploma For Bringing Two Great Cultures Closer Together".

== Biography ==
Alovert was born in Leningrad in 1935 to folklorist and literary scholar Elena Aleksandrovna Tudorovskaya and chemist Nikolai Nikolaevich Alovert. She graduated from Leningrad State University with a Master of Arts degree in history. With interest in history and ballet dance, she started her career as a curator for the Comedy Theatre Museum. She then worked for the Komissarzhevskaya Theatre and the Lensoviet Theatre as a photographer. In the early 1950s she worked as a photographer for the Kirov Ballet (now the Mariinsky).

In 1977, Alovert moved to the United States. She had been photographing Mikhail Baryshnikov from the start of his career until his defection from the Soviet Union to Canada. She resumed working with Baryshnikov after moving to the United States. While in the US, she worked for Dance Magazine and Ballet Review as a freelance photographer. Russian newspapers in the United States, such as Novoe Russkoe Slovo and Novy Amerikanets, featured photographs of ballet taken by Alovert. She has published her photographs in many journals and books in Russia and in other countries, and has held solo shows in New York City, London, St. Petersburg, and other centers.

== Credits ==
She has worked with many of Russian ballet dancers including Diana Vishneva, Zhanna Ayupova, Altynai Asylmuratova, Yulia Makhalina, Farukh Ruzimatov, Andris Liepa, Natalia Makarova, Nikolai Tsiskaridze, Alla Osipenko, and Uliana Lopatkina. Before moving to the US, she photographed Baryshnikov partnering Soviet prima ballerina Natalia Bessmertnova in Giselle.

Alovert has also photographed numerous personalities associated with Russian culture of the 20th and 21st centuries, including Sergey Dovlatov, Joseph Brodsky, Vladimir Visotsky, Marina Vlady, Mikhail Kozakov, Solomon Volkov, and Vladimir Voinovich.

In 2015 Alovert, then an octogenarian, staged a photo exhibition titled "The Gorgeous Features of My Dear Friends" at the ARKA art gallery in Vladivostok, and again in March 2016 at the Museum of Modern Arts in Birobidzhan, capital of the Jewish Autonomous Region. On 6 November 2015, she gave a talk, supplemented with her photographs of illustrious Russian ballet dancers and writers, to the students and professors of the theater department of the Far Eastern Arts Academy; she repeated this presentation before a general audience at the city public library.

== Publications ==
=== As author ===
- Baryshnikov in Russia. Holt, Rinehart & Winston. 1984.
- Vladimir Malakhov. 2003.
- Petersburg Mirrors. 2003.
- Mikhail Baryshnikov. 2004.
- Yulia Makhalina. 2009.
- Boris Eifman. Yesterday, Today... SPB. 2012.

=== As editor ===
- Nikolai Tsiskaridze. 2010.
