= Nikita Dolgushin =

- Никита Долгушин
- Born: November 8, 1938; Leningrad, Russian SFSR, Soviet Union
- Died: July 10, 2012 (aged 73); Saint Petersburg, Russia
- Resting place: Smolensky Cemetery, Saint Petersburg
- Occupations: Ballet dancer, choreographer, ballet teacher
- Years active: 1950–2012
- Spouse: Alla Baranova

Nikita Aleksandrovich Dolgushin (Note: Russian: Никита Александрович Долгушин, romanized: Nikita Aleksandrovich Dolgushin) (November 8, 1938 – June 10, 2012) was a Russian Soviet ballet dancer, choreographer, teacher. He was named People's Artist of the USSR in 1988.

== Education and Career ==
In 1959 he graduated from the Leningrad Choreographic School (Alexander Pushkin's course). Following graduation, Dolgushin joined Kirov Ballet and then moved to Novosibirsk. In 1961–1966, he was the leading dancer of the Novosibirsk Opera and Ballet Theatre. From 1968 to 1983 Dolgushin was a ballet dancer with the Mikhailovsky Theatre and Ballet and in 2007 returned to Saint Petersburg as a pedagogue. From 2009 to 2011 he was a chairman of the Mikhailovsky Theatre's Art Council. Throughout 15 remaining years of his life, Dolgushin served on a choreography faculty of the Saint Petersburg Conservatory.
