= Janet L. Springer =

American ballet dancer

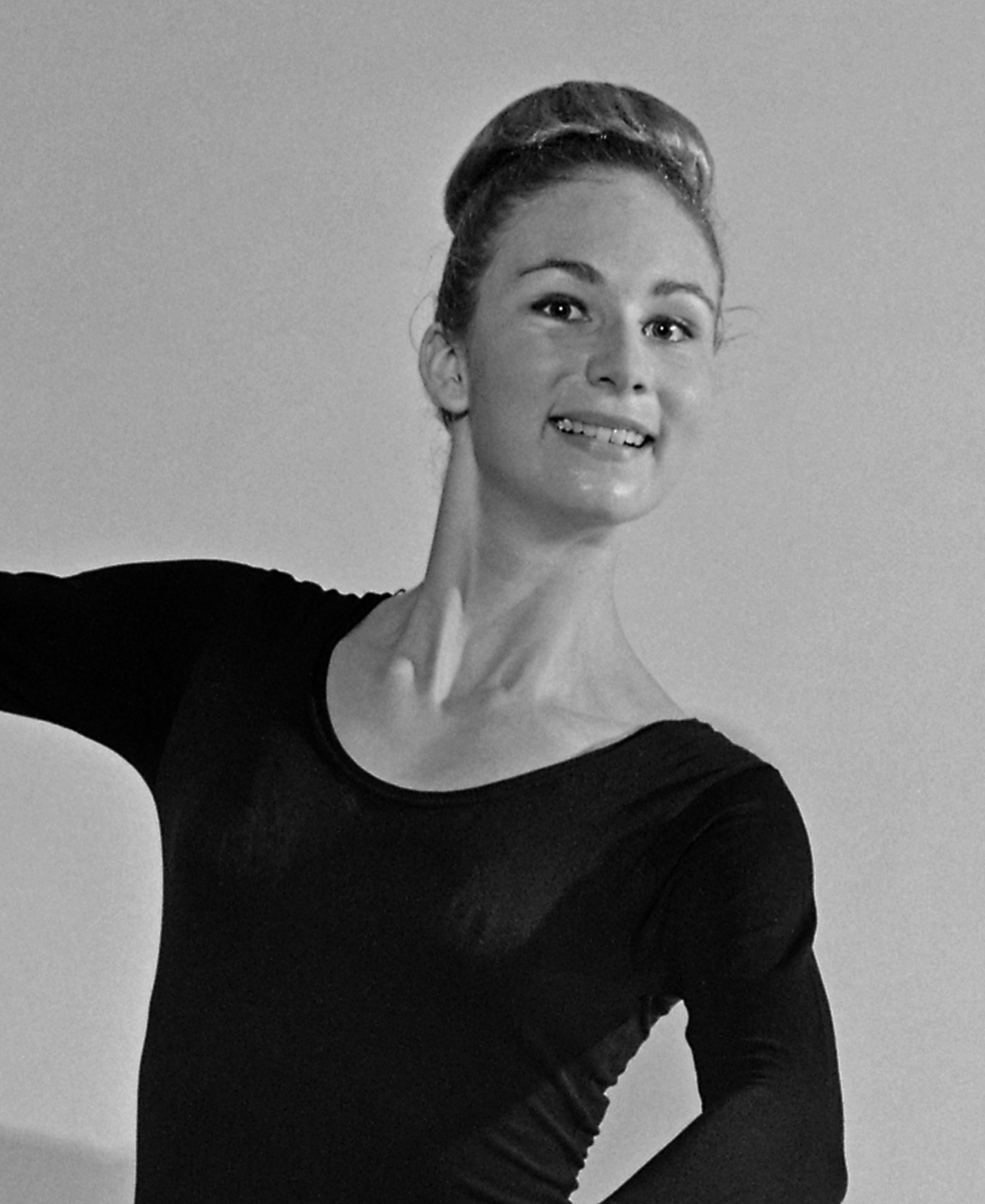
- Janet L. Springer in 1965
- Born: Janet Leslie Springer; Amarillo, Texas, U.S.
- Occupations: ballet dancer, artistic director, choreographer, and specialist in classical ballet
- Website: classicaldancealliance.org

Janet L. Springer is an American ballet dancer, artistic director, choreographer, and specialist in classical ballet. She was a professional dancer in the early 1970s with the Oklahoma City Ballet. She is a ballet pedagogue, specializing in the method of teaching classical dance; the six and eight-year program of ballet training developed by Agrippina Vaganova, and Vaganova's assistant, Vera Kostrovitskaya.

== Early life ==
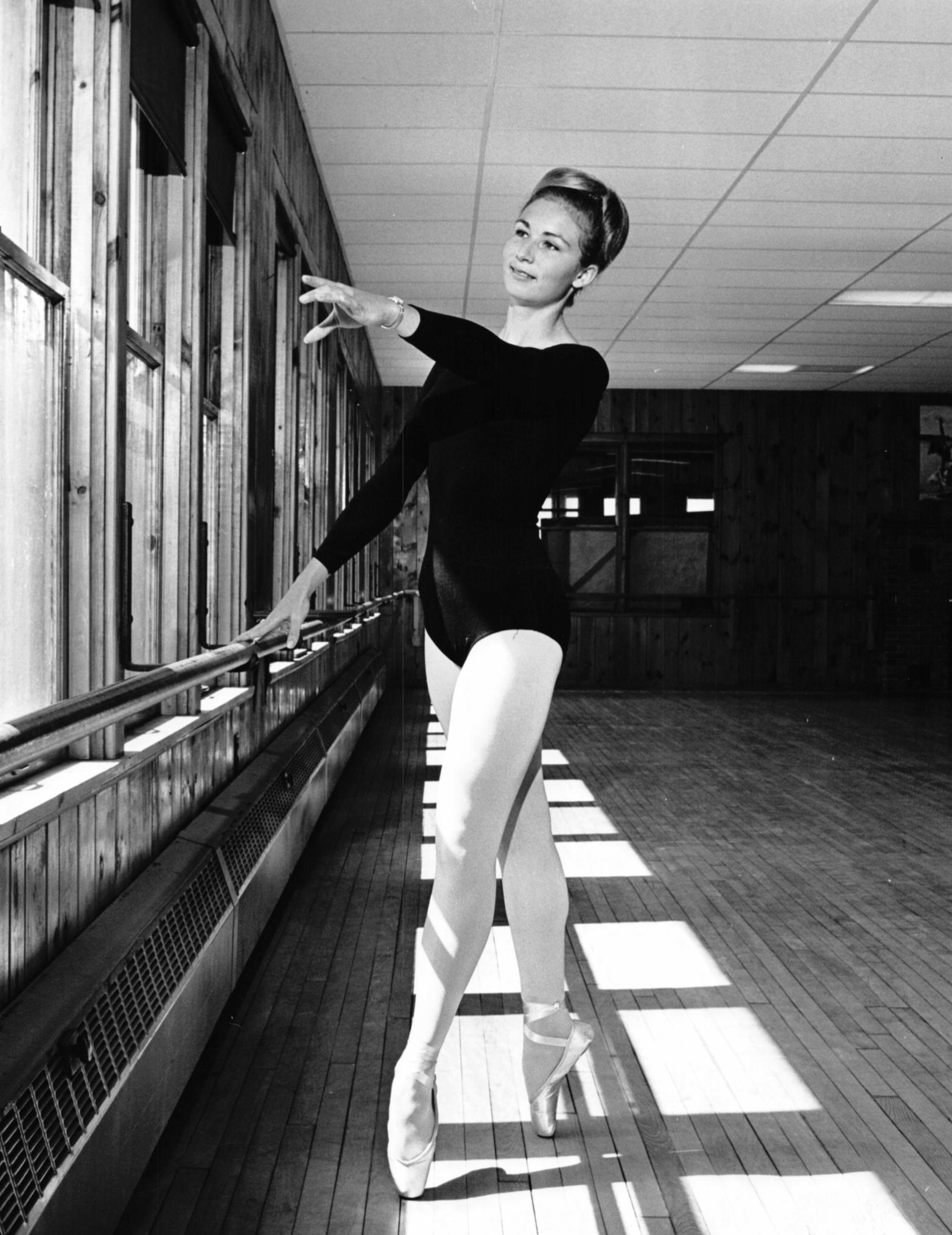
Janet L. Springer as a teenager at the Interlochen Center for the Arts. Photo courtesy of the Interlochen Special Collections and Archives; photographer Dugald Munro

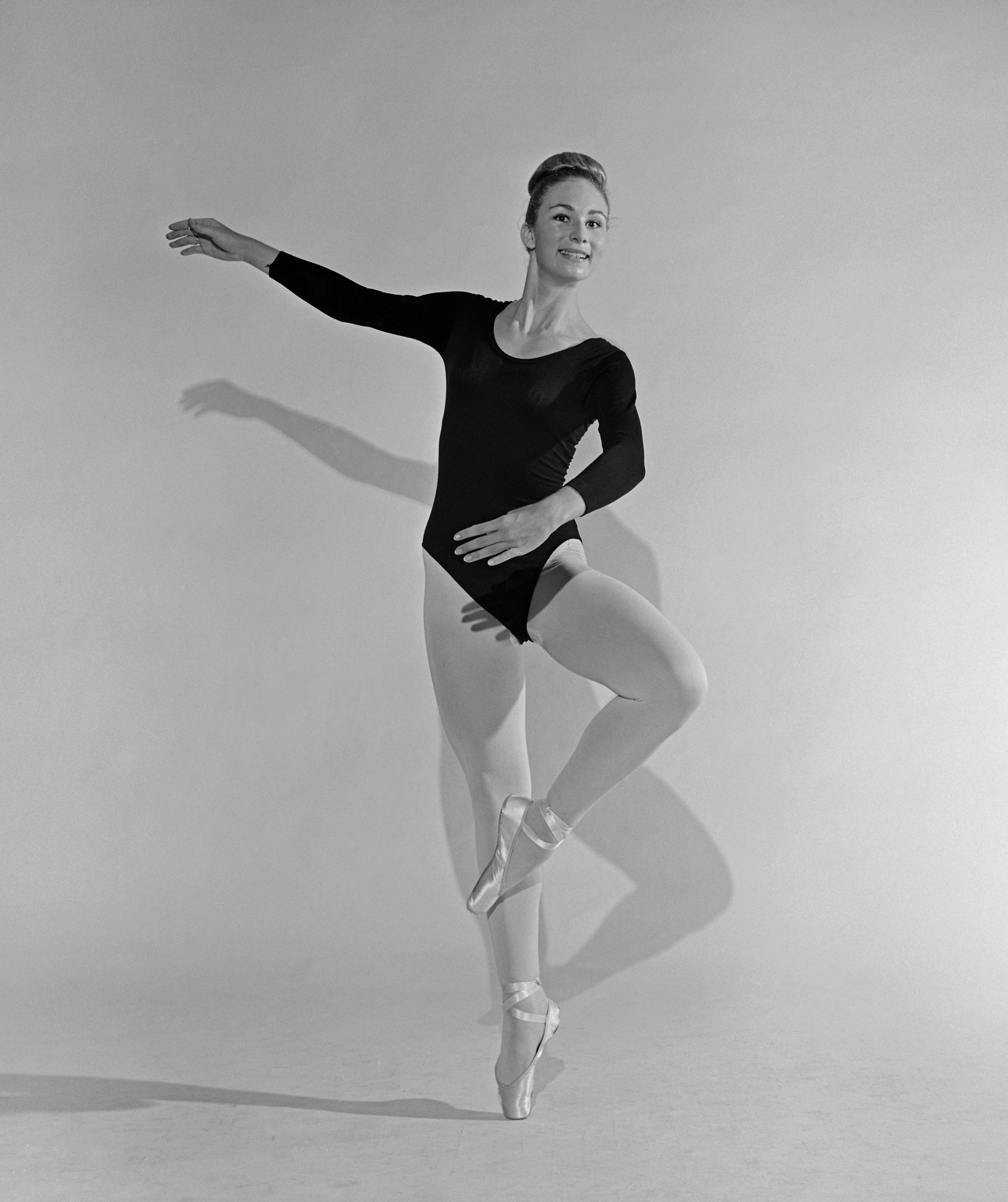
Janet L. Springer

Janet L. Springer was born in Amarillo, Texas. Her mother was Emily (Wentzel) Springer, a math teacher, and her father was Berl M. Springer, a chief executive officer for the South Western Public Service Company. She completed her high school education at Tascosa High School in Amarillo, Texas.

Springer started her early dance training with Neil Hess in Amarillo, and continued her ballet studies with Mieczyslaw "Maestro" Pianowski, who served as Anna Pavlova's ballet master for 13 years. Springer also studied ballet at the Interlochen Center for the Arts in Interlochen, Michigan.

In her early 20s, Springer danced in the musical drama "Texas." She also danced in various ballet productions while pursuing her studies at the University of Oklahoma.

== Career ==
Springer received her BFA in Ballet from the University of Oklahoma in Norman, Oklahoma, and her master's degree in ballet from Indiana University in Bloomington, Indiana. She studied the Russian ballet school's choreographic teaching method with John Barker, who was a leading American authority on Russian classical ballet in the West. Barker studied under Agrippina Vaganova's assistant, Vera Kostrovitskaya at the Vaganova Academy.

Springer furthered her ballet pedagogical studies at the White Nights teachers courses at the Vaganova Academy in St. Petersburg, Russia.

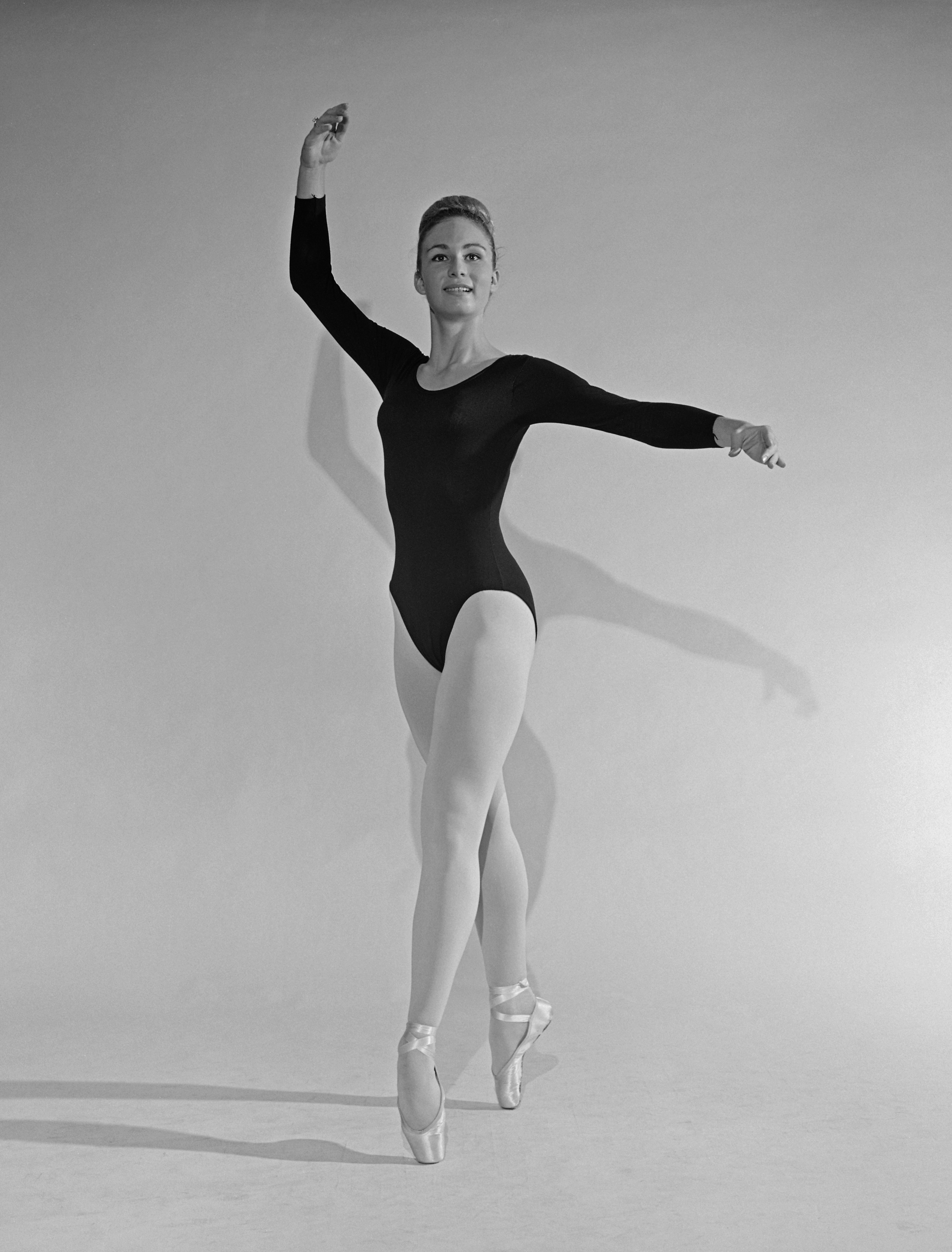
Springer 1965

Springer was the artistic and executive director of the Ballet Center, Community Music School of Buffalo, New York for eight years. She was the artistic director of the Colorado Ballet Company and School in Pueblo, Colorado, and the founder of the Colorado Outdoor Performing Arts Association. She also taught at the Boston Ballet School for two years under Anna-Marie Holmes. Springer was the founding artistic director of the New York School of Classical Dance in New York City. She was also the director of the International Youth Ballet festival in the U.S. and St. Petersburg, Russia in association with Oleg Vinogradov She is currently the executive director of the non profit organization, Classical Dance Alliance, based in New York City. The organization hosts ballet teachers courses, featuring guest teachers such as Vladimir Kolesnekov who danced with the Kirov Ballet in St. Petersburg, Russia and Irina Kolpakova. She also teaches ballet teacher's courses in classical dance at the Ana Köhler School of Dance in Lisbon, Portugal in conjunction with CID UNESCO International Dance Council.

Springer also produced and directed, Musical Compositions for Historical Dance Lessons, arranged and performed by pianist, Marina Gendel.
