= Galina Mezentseva =

Russian ballet dancer

- Born: Galina Sergeyevna Mezentseva; 8 November 1952 (age 73); Stavropol, Russia
- Education: Vaganova Academy of Russian Ballet
- Occupation: Ballet dancer
- Awards: Selected: Honored Artist of Russia (1978), People's Artist of Russia (1983)

Galina Sergeyevna Mezentseva (Russian: Галина Серге́евна Мéзенцева, born 8 November 1952, Stavropol) is a Russian ballerina, with a career as professional classic dancer from the early 1970s to the late 1990s. Mezentseva completed her dancing studies in 1970 at the Vaganova Ballet Academy in Saint Petersburg, Russia. She was the first of the crop of tall Kirov ballerinas with long and thin lines, introducing a new aesthetic look to ballet audiences. Mezentseva is recognized as a dramatic performer, and is known for her improvisation.

== Career ==
Mezentseva completed her dancing studies in 1970 at the Vaganova Ballet Academy in Saint Petersburg, Russia. After graduation, she got the position of principal dancer at the Kirov/Mariinsky Ballet, keeping it for almost 20 years. In 1990 she left Russia to live in the UK. From 1990 to 1994, Mezentseva worked as a guest dancer at the Scottish Ballet (Glasgow). From 1994 to 2000, she toured the US and other countries as guest star with the Saint Petersburg State Academic Ballet, directed by Askold Makarov. Since then Mezentseva has worked as a ballet teacher and as an occasional performer.

== Awards ==
Galina Mezentseva received many prestigious awards and titles: First Prize Laureate Award of the International Ballet Competition in Moscow (1977), Honored Artist of Russia (1978), National State Prize Winner (1980), Gold Medal at the International Ballet Competition (Japan, 1980) and The People's Artist of Russia (1983).

The intensity of Mezentseva's best live performances is believed to not translate well into the (few) available recorded presentations. Most of these recordings were taken after a severe achilles tendon rupture experienced by her in the early 1980s.

== Ulyana Lopatkina on Mezentseva ==
Ulyana Lopatkina, the Kirov's principal dancer (2007), compared Galina Ulanova, Ekaterina Maximova and Galina Mezentseva, her favorite ballerinas, in an interview given in 2005:

They all had different personalities. Ulanova was sincere, she astonished ballet-goers with her utter fidelity to human feelings. Maximova had exceptional physique and moved very beautifully. And Mezentseva – oh, she was serene, she was a queen, she had poise, beautiful lines and a profound dramatism. She could cast a spell effortlessly. The strongest impression anyone has made on me was Mezentseva with her Dying Swan.

- Mezentseva performing Dying Swan Video on YouTube (retrieved January 2, 2008)

== Filmography ==
- Galina Mezentseva's Filmography Ballet lessons and ballet performances at MSN Movies (retrieved January 7, 2008)
- Galina Mezentseva, Ballet Dancer (film-concert) Lentelefilm/Ochakovo Films (Russia, 75 min, color, 1981, retrieved January 7, 2008)
- Classical Ballet LessonPeggy Willis-Aarnio and Galina Mezentseva. Willis Ballet Educational Video Library, 1993, retrieved April 16, 2014
- Galina Mezentseva Prima Ballerina Assoluta Willis Ballet Educational Video Library, 1995 retrieved April 16, 2014.

== See also ==
- List of Russian ballet dancers
