= Iris Hensley =

Iris Hensley (1934–2003) founded The Georgia Ballet (originally named the Cobb/Marietta Ballet) in 1960 and served as the Artistic Director until her death in August 2003. In addition to directing The Georgia Ballet and teaching at The Georgia Ballet School (The Georgia Ballet's associated ballet school), Mrs. Hensley was the former director and co-chairman for the Board for the Southern Regional Ballet Association, a member of the dance panel for the Georgia Council for the Arts, and a guest instructor for the Governor's Honors Program. She choreographed many ballets throughout her lifetime for both her company dancers and her ballet students. Iris Hensley's The Nutcracker is still performed every December by The Georgia Ballet, which is currently directed by Gina Hyatt Mazon, a former principal dancer with John Neumeir's Hamburg ballet. Iris Hensley is the mother of Shuler Hensley who performs on Broadway and tours professionally. The Georgia High School Musical Theatre Awards, part of the National High School Musical Theatre Awards – The Jimmy Nederlander Awards, are named in Shuler Hensley's honor.

== Choreography ==
- The Nutcracker
- Gershwin Concerto
- Dancing with Denver
- The Nightingale
- Carnival of the Animals
- I Never Saw Another Butterfly performed in 1977 throughout the Abruzzi Region of Italy as part of a cultural arts exchange program. Performing Members of Iris' school of ballet included Sharon Hildreth, Sheila Willis Hart (Kleiman). Other artistic choreographers on the tour included J Michael Kane. Kane choreographed selections from I Never Saw Another Butterfly as well as an original work, Somewhere in Silence, wihich featured Hensley's Assistant Director and soloist dancer: Sheila Willis Hart (Kleiman). Other groups which performed on the tour were the Albany Jazz Quartet, The Atlanta Boy Choir, The Atlanta Opera Society and many other collaborative arts groups.
- The Adventures of Mary Poppins
- Five Guys Named Moe
- The Seven Last Words of Christ
- Fantasy Variations
- Scottish Suites(included authentic sword dancing).

== Awards ==
- Lillian Bennet Sullivan Award – for her work in inaugurating the Performing Arts package for thousands of Cobb County school children
