= Kevin Martin (dancer) =

American dancer

- Born: January 18, 1957 (age 69); Los Angeles County, Calfironia
- Occupations: ballet dancer, ballet teacher, ballet master

Kevin Martin (born 1957) is an American dancer, ballet teacher, and former ballet master of the Nutmeg Ballet Conservatory.

== Early life ==
Martin was born to Robert and Jane Martin (née Whitener), and was the seventh of eight children. He started dancing at the age of 8 at Hickory Dance. At the age of 15, Martin became the youngest lead dancer in the outdoor historical drama, Unto These Hills for three consecutive years.

== Career ==
After graduating from Hickory High School in 1975, Martin moved to New York to study at the John Barker School of Classical Ballet under the guidance of John Barker. He studied there for six years. In 1981, Martin competed in the renowned Moscow International Ballet Competition (Международный конкурс артистов балета и хореографов) in Moscow, Russia. After training under Barker, Martin went on to perform with ballet companies across 38 states over the span of 25 years. In addition to his performance career, Martin dedicated himself to teaching and played a pivotal role in developing summer dance intensives starting in 1985. Martin went on to serve as the Director of the Men's Division and Audition Master At Large of the Nutmeg Ballet in Torrington, Connecticut for fifteen years (1992-2007).
