= Farukh Ruzimatov =

Russian ballet dancer (born 1963)

- Фарух Рузиматов
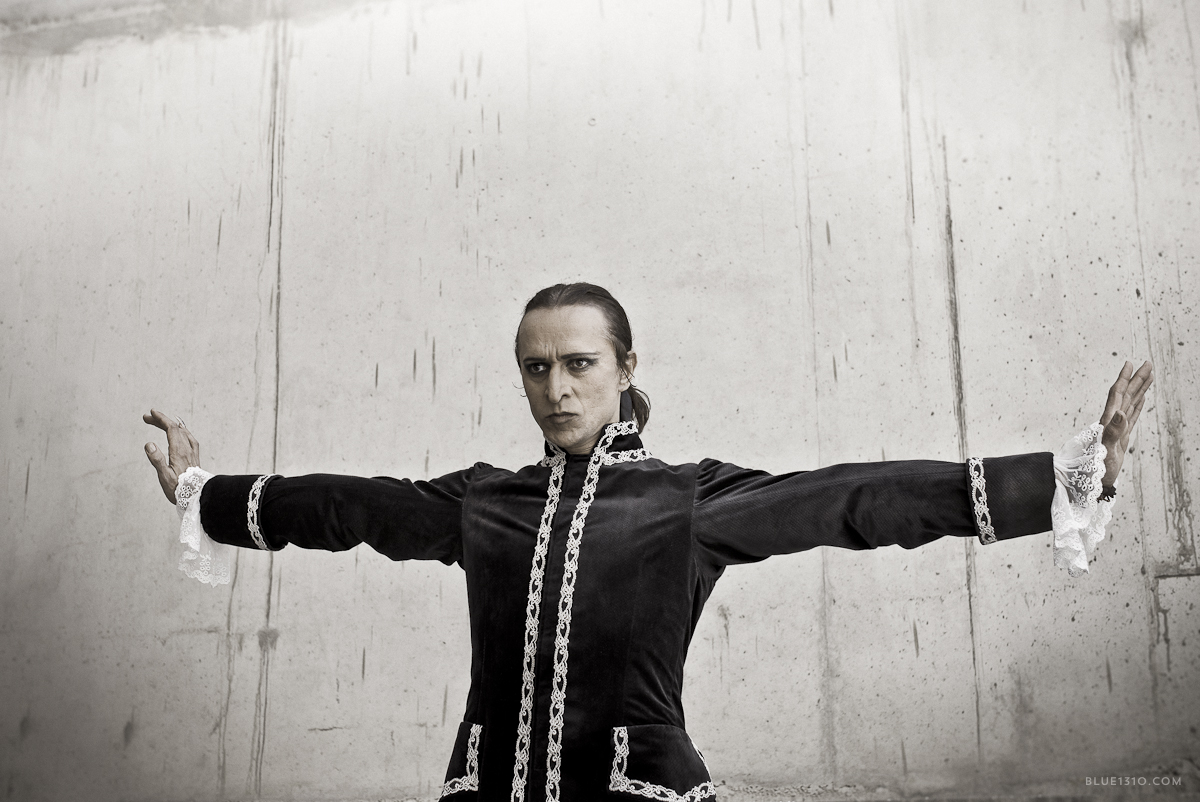
- Born: Farukh Sadullayevich Ruzimatov; 26 June 1963 (age 63); Tashkent, Uzbek SSR, Soviet Union (now Uzbekistan)
- Citizenship: Russian
- Education: Vaganova Academy

Farukh Sadullayevich Ruzimatov (Russian: Фару́х Садулла́евич Рузима́тов; born 26 June 1963) is an Uzbek-Russian ballet dancer. Since 2018, Ruzimatov has been artistic director of the ballet company at Navoi Theatre in Tashkent, Uzbekistan. In a dancing career spanning more than three decades, Ruzimatov was mostly associated with the Mariinsky Theatre, where he was the principal dancer and assistant artistic director of the company.

== Biography ==
Ruzimatov was born in Tashkent, Uzbek SSR, Soviet Union (now Uzbekistan).

Ruzimatov enrolled in the Vaganova Academy in 1973 in Leningrad, where he trained under Gennady Selyutsky. Upon his 1981 graduation, Ruzimatov began dancing with the Kirov Ballet and became a principal dancer in 1986.

His repertoire includes such roles as Albrecht in Giselle, Solor in La Bayadère, Golden Slave in Shéhérazade, Ali in Le Corsaire, Prince Desire in The Sleeping Beauty, The Prince in The Nutcracker, Siegfried in Swan Lake, Basil in Don Quixote, and many others. He has also performed as principal guest artist with the American Ballet Theatre.

From 2007 to 2009, he was artistic director of the ballet at the Mikhailovsky Theatre. Since 2018, Ruzimatov is artistic director of the ballet company at Navoi Theatre in Tashkent, Uzbekistan.

== Partnerships ==
Ruzimatov has had many successful partnerships, but the two most well known are probably his collaboration with Yulia Makhalina in Kirov productions of Giselle and La Bayadere, and he partnered Larissa Lezhnina in her Kirov debut as Aurora in the 1989 production of The Sleeping Beauty. He went on to partner her in Diana and Acteon, but as she left the Kirov to become a soloist for the Dutch National Ballet in 1994, their promising collaboration was cut short. But the strongest partnership was with Altynai Asylmuratova. The couple were most seen dancing together in the ballet Le Corsaire, but when Asylmuratova retired, Ruzimatov was later dancing with Diana Vishneva in the early 2000s.

== Awards ==
- Honoured Artist of Russia (1995)
- People's Artist of Russia (2000)
- Honoured Artist of Tajikistan (1988)
- Silver Medallist of the Sixth Varna International Competition (1983)
- Special diploma by the Paris Academy of Dance
- Prix Benois de la Danse (1997)
- Prizewinner of Baltika prize (1998)
