= Askold Makarov =

Askold Anatolievich Makarov (Russian: Аско́льд Анато́льевич Мака́ров; 3 May 1925 – 25 December 2000) was a Russian ballet dancer and ballet professor, leading soloist at the Kirov Ballet during the 1960s and early 1970s. Director of the Saint Petersburg State Academic Ballet from 1976 to 2000. Awarded with: State Prize of the USSR (1951) and People's Artist of the USSR (1983).

Askold Makarov became director of the theater Choreographic Miniatures after the Leonid Yakobson's death in 1975.
