= Galina Stepanenko =

Russian ballerina

Galina Olegovna Stepanenko
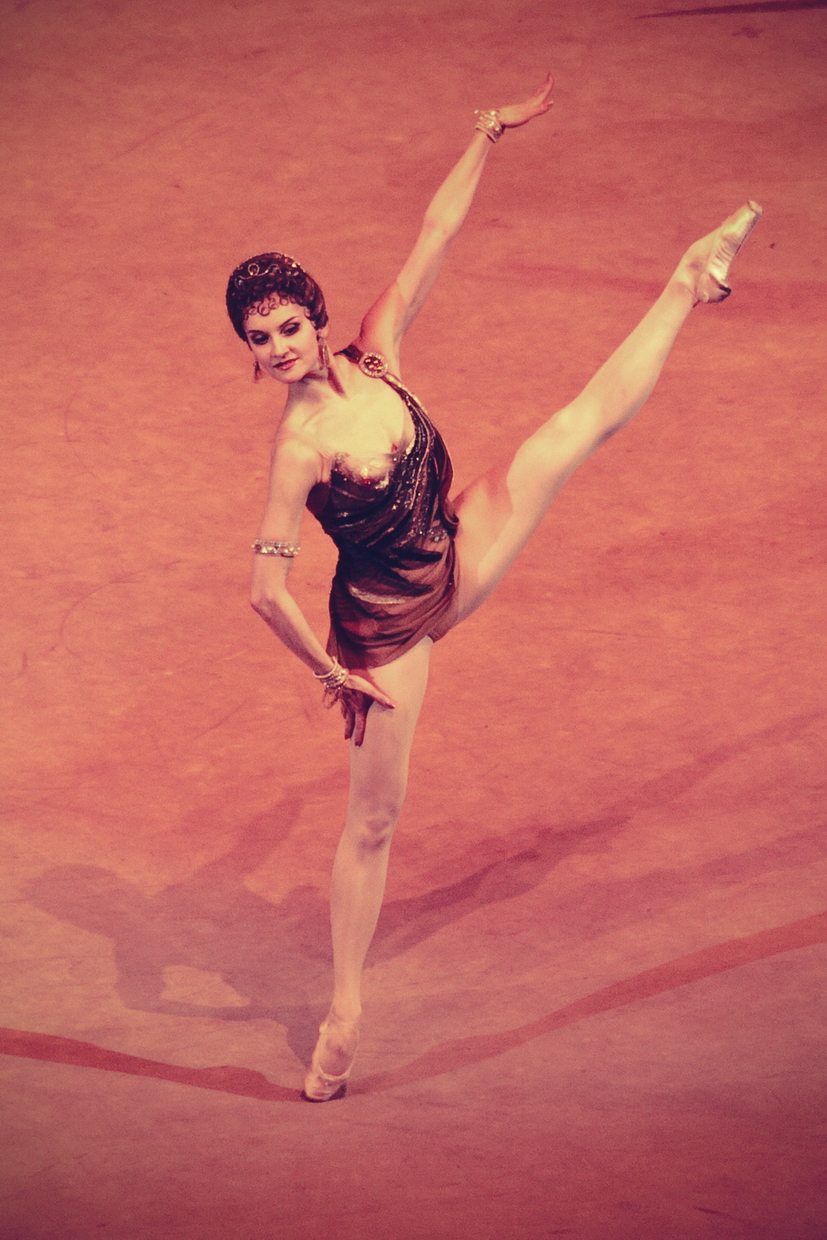
- Galina Stepanenko as Aegina in Spartacus, with the Bolshoi Ballet
- Born: Галина Олеговна Степаненко; 12 June 1966 (age 59); Moscow, Soviet Union
- Education: Moscow Academic Choreographic School
- Occupations: Ballerina; Ballet teacher
- Years active: 1984–present
- Career
- Current group: Bolshoi Ballet
- Former groups: Moscow Classical Ballet; Stanislavski and Nemirovich-Danchenko Theatre

Galina Olegovna Stepanenko (Russian: Галина Олеговна Степаненко; born 12 June 1966) is a Russian ballet teacher. She is a former prima ballerina of the Bolshoi Ballet, and since 2013 has been head of the Bolshoi's ballet troupe.

== Biography ==
Born in Moscow on 12 June 1966, Stepanenko studied rhythmic gymnastics, studying to the first grade and receiving an invitation to the Olympic Reserve School. In 1976 she entered the Moscow Academic Choreographic School, studying under Professor Sofia Golovkina, and graduating with honours in 1984. During her studies she danced several main roles in the school's performances: as Swanhilda in Coppélia, Lise in La fille mal gardée, and the soloist in the Paquita grand pas classique.

Between 1984 and 1988 Stepanenko was a soloist of the Moscow Classical Ballet ensemble, studying under Marina Kolpakchi-Kuznetsova. In 1988 Stepanenko joined the troupe of the Stanislavski and Nemirovich-Danchenko Theatre, spending two years there under the tutelage of Nina Chkalova. In 1990 Stepanenko was accepted into the Bolshoi Ballet, where she was taught by, at first, Marina Semyonova, and later rehearsed with Marina Kondratyeva, Raisa Struchkova, and Ekaterina Maximova.

In 1992 Stepanenko graduated from the Russian Institute of Theatre Arts, having taken the course of Marina Semyonova, and received the specialty of a teacher-choreographer. In December 2012 Stepanenko retired from dancing and became a teacher-coach for the Bolshoi Ballet. On 22 January 2013 she became acting artistic director of the ballet troupe, and since autumn 2013 she has been head of the Bolshoi's ballet troupe.

== Repertoire ==
=== With the Moscow Classical Ballet ===
- Natalie (Natalie, or the Swiss Milkmaid)
- Soloist (Theme and Variations)
- Devil (La création du monde)
- Soloist (Bachiana) 1987, choreographer Alberto Alonso

=== With the Stanislavski and Nemirovich-Danchenko Theatre ===
- Odette-Odile (Swan Lake)
- Kitri and the Queen of the Dryads (Don Quixote)
- Kupava (The Snow Maiden)
- Medora (Le Corsaire)

=== With the Bolshoi Ballet ===
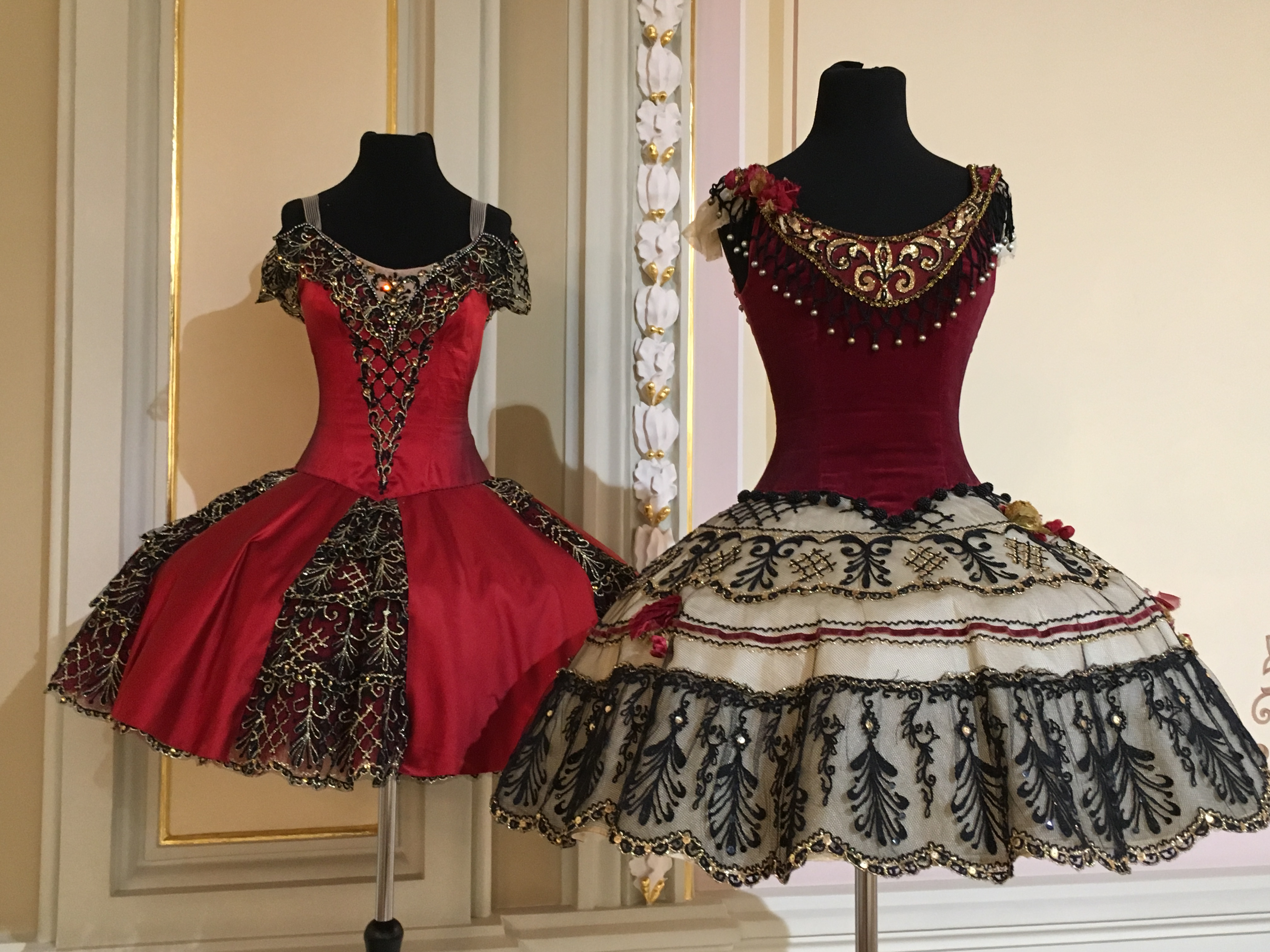
Tutus worn during the Bolshoi's 2009 production of Paquita, including Galina Stepanenko's (left) and Ekaterina Krysanova's (right)

- 1991 - Odette-Odile in Swan Lake by Pyotr Ilyich Tchaikovsky, arranged by Yury Grigorovich
- 1991 - Giselle in Giselle by Adolphe Adam, arranged by Yury Grigorovich
- 1991 - Nikiya in La Bayadère by Ludwig Minkus, arranged by Yury Grigorovich
- 1992 - Medora in Le Corsaire by Adolphe Adam, arranged by Konstantin Sergeyev
- 1992 - Bacchante in Walpurgis Night from the opera Faust by Charles Gounod, choreography by Leonid Lavrovsky
- 1993 - Raymonda in Raymonda by Alexander Glazunov, arranged by Yury Grigorovich
- 1994 - Rita in The Golden Age by Dmitri Shostakovich, choreography by Yury Grigorovich
- 1994 - Kitri in Don Quixote by Ludwig Minkus, arranged by Yury Grigorovich
- 1995 - La Sylphide in La Sylphide by Herman Løvenskiold, choreography by August Bournonville, staging by E. M. von Rosen
- 1995 - Aegina in Spartacus by Aram Khachaturian, choreographer Yury Grigorovich
- 1995 - Juliet in Romeo and Juliet by Sergei Prokofiev, choreography by Leonid Lavrovsky
- 1996 - The Swan Princess in Swan Lake by Pyotr Ilyich Tchaikovsky, production by Vladimir Vasiliev
- 1996 - Anyuta in Anyuta to music by Valery Gavrilin, choreographer Vladimir Vasiliev
- 1997 - Princess Aurora in The Sleeping Beauty by Pyotr Ilyich Tchaikovsky, arranged by Yury Grigorovich
- 1998 - Gamzatti in La Bayadère by Ludwig Minkus, arranged by Yury Grigorovich
- 1999 - Soloist of the 4th movement in Symphony in C to music by Georges Bizet, choreography by George Balanchine
- 1999 - Seventh Waltz and Prelude in Chopiniana to music by Frédéric Chopin, choreography by Michel Fokine
- 1999 - Popadya in Balda to music by Dmitri Shostakovich, choreographer Vladimir Vasiliev
- 2002 - Odette-Odile in Swan Lake by Pyotr Ilyich Tchaikovsky, arranged by Yury Grigorovich
- 2004 - Dancer in Tarantella to music by Louis Moreau Gottschalk, choreography by George Balanchine
- 2004 - Classical dancer in The Limpid Stream to music by Dmitri Shostakovich, choreographer Alexei Ratmansky
- 2006 - Carmen in Carmen Suite by Rodion Shchedrin, choreographer Alberto Alonso
- 2009 - Paquita in Paquita grand pas classique by Ludwig Minkus, arranged by Yury Burlaka

== Honours and awards ==
- 1984 - Laureate of the All-Union Ballet Competition in Moscow (1st prize and Prize of the Leningrad Choreographic School, junior group)
- 1985 - Laureate of the International Ballet Competition in Moscow (2nd prize, junior group)
- 1989 - Laureate of the International Ballet Competition in Moscow (1st prize, senior group)
- 1994 - Honoured Artist of Russia
- 1995 - Prize of the International Association of Choreographers Prix Benois de la Danse for the performance of the part of Kitri in the ballet Don Quixote
- 1995 - Prize "Etoile" from the magazine "Danza & Danza" (Bolzano, Italy)
- 1996 - People's Artist of the Russian Federation
- 2001 - Order of Honour
- 2004 - Prize of the magazine Ballet, "Soul of the Dance", in the nomination "Queen of the Dance"
