= Anna Nikulina =

Russian ballet dancer (born 1985)

Anna Nikulina Анна Никулина
- Born: Anna Nikulina; 23 March 1985 (age 41); Moscow, Russian SFSR, Soviet Union (now Russia)
- Education: Moscow State Academy of Choreography
- Occupation: Ballet dancer
- Years active: 2002 to present
- Employer: Bolshoi Ballet
- Awards: People's Artist of the Russian Federation (2024); Honored Artist of the Russian Federation (2018)

Anna Nikulina (Russian: Анна Никулина; born 23 March 1985) is a principal dancer with the Bolshoi Ballet in Moscow, Russia. Her first lead role was Odette-Odile in Swan Lake in 2004 at the age of 19. She has toured both internationally and within Russia. Her répétiteur (rehearsal coach) as of 2021 is Olga Chenchikova, a former Kirov principal. In previous years her répétiteurs have been the important Russian dancers Ekaterina Maximova, Nina Semizorova, and Ludmila Semenyaka. She graduated in 2002 with honors from the Moscow State Academy of Choreography.

She has worked with Russian choreographer Yury Grigorovich in performance of his productions. In late 2021 when Grigorovich received an artistic award but could not travel due to pandemic restrictions, Nikulina accepted the award on his behalf.

== Tours ==
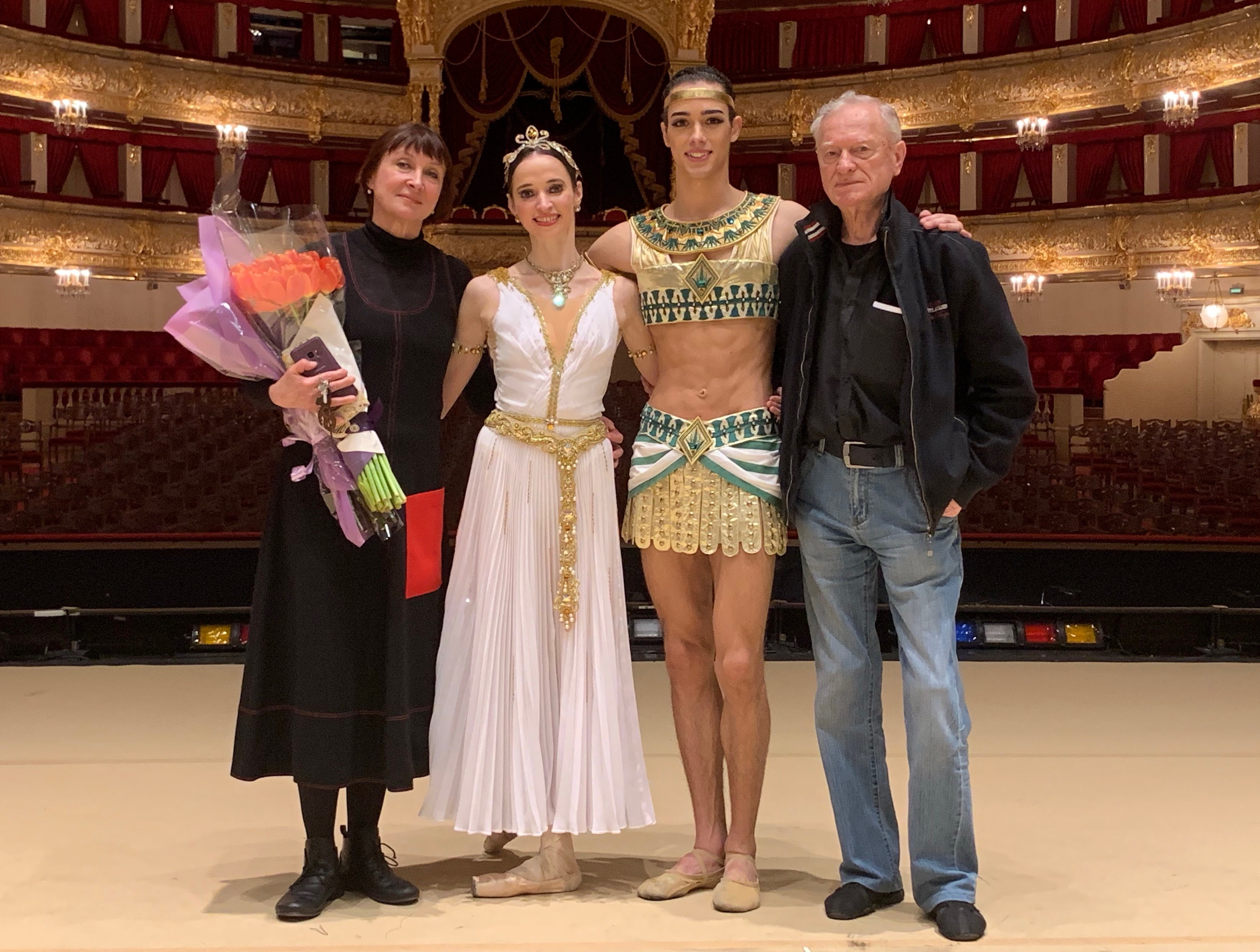
Anna Nikulina, with David Motta Soares, for performance of The Pharaoh's Daughter

She has appeared in lead roles with the Bolshoi on tour in New York City (2014), Washington DC, Los Angeles, Sydney Australia, Hong Kong, and London. As visiting artist she has led shows with the Teatro dell'Opera di Roma in Rome (2018), and tours of Greece and Israel.

In Russia, where the Bolshoi and the Ministry of Culture support the touring of soloists to major cities within the Federation, she has appeared with the ballet companies of Kazan (2011), Samara (2014), Ufa (2015), Chelyabinsk (2011, 2015), Saratov (2016), and Novosibirsk (2019).

Alluding to the various endings of Swan Lake, she remarked in an interview that, “You never know what to expect from the Swan. In Moscow they kill me, in Kazan I am happy with the prince, but here, in Chelyabinsk, I am left alone on the lake."

== Roles ==
(Year of first performance)

2004
- Sylph/four sylphs (La Sylphide), choreography by A. Bournonville, E. M. von Rosen's version
- 2nd variation in The Shadows Scene (La Bayadère), choreography by M. Petipa, Y. Grigorovich's version
- Part (Passacaille) to music by A. von Webern, choreography by R. Petit
- Friend/friends to Giselle, Two Wilis (Giselle, choreography by J. Coralli, J. Perrot, M.Petipa, Y. Grigorovich's version
- Odette-Odile (Swan Lake), choreography by A. Gorsky, L.Ivanov, Y. Grigorovich's second version
- Fairy of Audacity (The Sleeping Beauty), choreography by Y. Grigorovich
- 'Two Couples' in Part 3 (Symphony in C), choreography by G. Balanchine
- Magnolia (Cipollino), choreography by G. Mayorov

2005

- Final Waltz and Apotheosis (The Nutcracker), choreography by Y. Grigorovich
- Congo (The Pharaoh's Daughter, production by P. Lacotte after M. Petipa
- Friend/friends to Shireen (A Legend of Love, choreography by Y. Grigorovich
- Swan/Three Swans (Swan Lake)
- Henriette (Raymonda, choreography by M. Petipa, Y. Grigorovich's version
- Temptation (Les Presages, choreography by L. Massine
- The 2nd Variation in Grand Pas (Don Quixote (ballet)), choreography by M. Petipa, A. Gorsky, A. Fadeyechev's version)
- Spanish Doll (Nutcracker)

2006

- Friend/friends to Zina (The Bright Stream), choreography by . A. Ratmansky
- The 3rd variation in The Kingdom of the Shades scene (La Bayadere)
- Lyuska (The Golden Age), choreography by Y.Grigorovich
- Friend/friends to the Prince (Swan Lake)
- The Queen of the Dryads (Don Quixote)
- Fairy of Tenderness (The Sleeping Beauty) — debut on the Bolshoi Theatre tour to Novosibirsk
- Soloist (Jeu de cards), choreography by A. Ratmansky
- Marie (Nutcracker)

2007

- Soloist (In the Upper Room), choreography by T. Tharp
- Pas de Trois des Odalisques (Le Corsaire), production and new choreography by A. Ratmansky and Y. Burlaka after M. Petipa
- Part in (Class Concert), choreography by A. Messerer
- Summer (Cinderella), choreography by Y. Possokhov, director Y. Borisov

2008

- Mime/mimes (Spartacus (ballet)), choreography by Yuri Grigorovich
- Adeline (Flames of Paris), production and new choreography by A. Ratmansky after V. Vainonen
- Phrygia (Spartacus) — debut on the Bolshoi Theatre tour to Hong Kong
- Giselle (Giselle), V. Vasiliev's version
- Couple in Claret Red (Russian Seasons), choreography by A. Ratmansky — among the creators at the Bolshoi Theatre

2009

- Fleur de Lys (La Esmeralda', choreography by M. Petipa; staging and new choreographic version by Y. Burlaka and V. Medvedev

2010

- La Priere (Coppelia), choreography by M. Petipa and E. Cecchetti; revival and new choreographic version by S. Vikharev
- Juliet (Romeo and Juliet (Prokofiev)) by S. Prokofiev, choreography by Y. Grigorovich
- Lilac Fairy (The Sleeping Beauty)
- Raymonda (Raymonda)
- Raymonda (Giselle), Y. Grigorovich’s version
- Quintet (Herman Schmerman), choreography by W. Forsythe

2011

- Nikia (La Bayadere)
- Princess Aurora (The Sleeping Beauty)

2012

- Soloist (Dream of Dream), choreography by J. Elo
- Polyhymnia (Apollon Musagète), choreography by G. Balanchine — creation at the Bolshoi Theatre
- Anastasia (Ivan the Terrible (Prokofiev)), choreography by Y. Grigorovich

2013

- Medora (Le Corsaire)

2014

- Shireen (A Legend of Love)

2015

- Zina (The Bright Stream)
- Couple in Green (Russian Seasons)

2016

- Rita (The Golden Age)

2017

- Ballerina (Etudes, to Music of Czerny), choreography by H. Lander
- The Leading Couple (Diamonds), Part III of Jewels (ballet), choreography by G. Balanchine
- Sylph (La Sylphide), production and new choreography by J. Kobborg)
- Carmen (Carmen Suite), choreography by A. Alonso)

2018

- Kitri (Don Quixote), A. Fadeyechev's second version

2019

- Aspicia (La Fille du Pharaon)
- Soloist Part 2 (Symphony in C), choreography by G. Balanchine
- Hermione (The Winter's Tale (ballet)), choreography by Ch.Wheeldon
- Giselle (Giselle), A. Ratmansky's version

2020

- Couple in Black (Forgotten Land) to music by B. Britten, choreography by J. Kylián
- Princess Mary (A Hero of Our Time (ballet)), choreography by Y. Possokhov

== Awards ==
- 2004: Youth Grant Russia prize "Triumph"
- 2010: Golden Lyre Award, for workers of culture and art
- 2018: Merited Artist of the Russian Federation
- 2022: "Soul of Dance" Prize ("The Star" nomination), The Ballet Magazine
- 2024: People's Artist of the Russian Federation
