= Anastasia Stashkevich =

Russian dancer (born 1984)

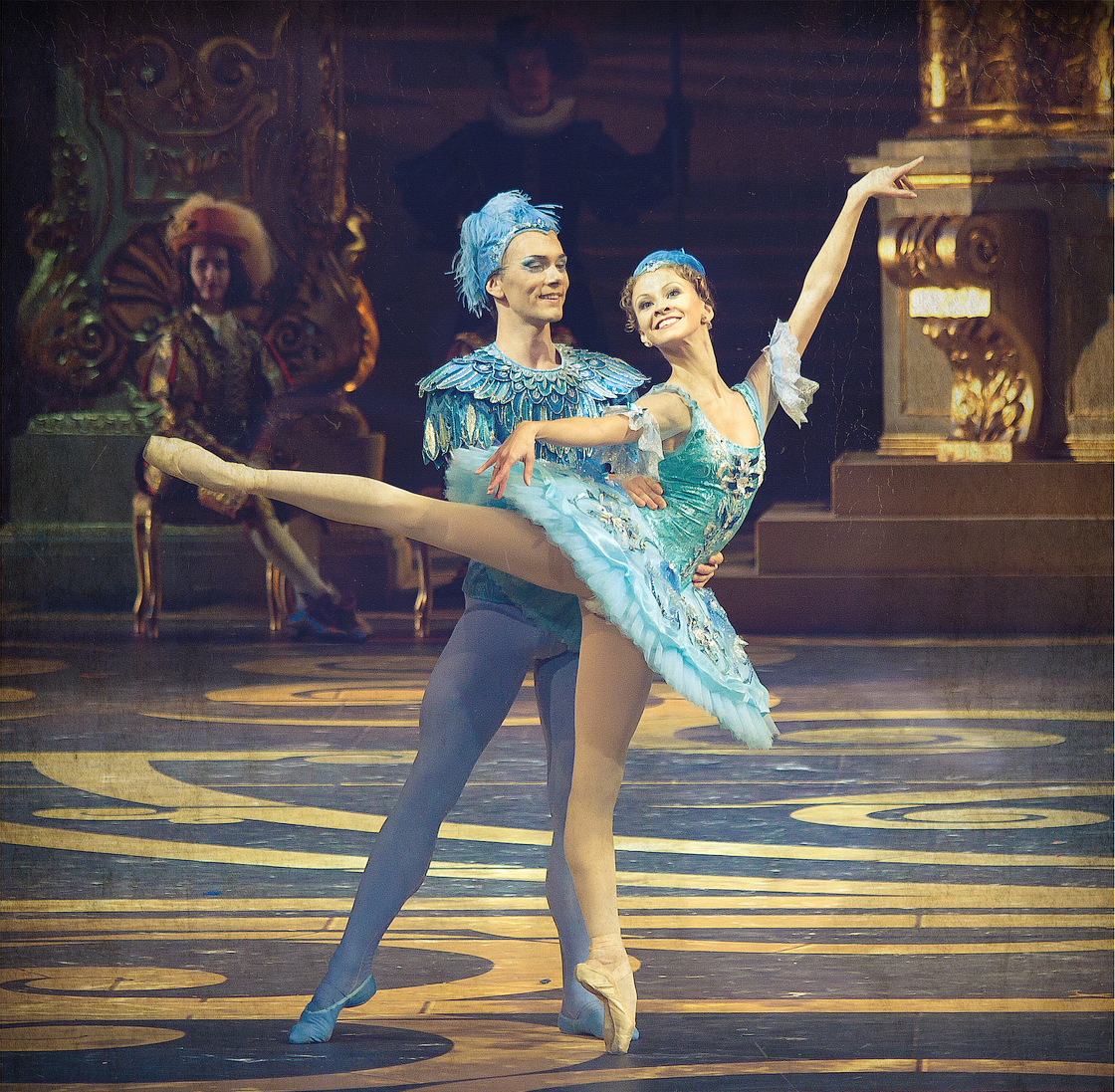
- Anastasia Stashkevich as Princess Florine in The Sleeping Beauty, with Vyacheslav Lopatin as the Bluebird. Bolshoi Theatre. 23 November 2011
- Born: Анастасия Витальевна Сташкевич; 20 November 1984 (age 41); Leningrad, Soviet Union (now St. Petersburg, Russia)
- Citizenship: Russian Federation
- Education: Moscow State Academy of Choreography
- Occupation: Ballet dancer
- Years active: 2003 to present
- Employer: Bolshoi Theatre

Anastasia Stashkevich (Russian: Анастасия Сташкевич; born 20 November 1984) is a Russian principal dancer with the Bolshoi Ballet.

Anastasia Stashkevich was born in Leningrad, and studied at the Moscow Choreographic Academy with Tatyana Galtseva. Upon her graduation in 2003 she joined the Bolshoi Ballet, where she presently works under the tutelage of Svetlana Adyrkhaeva. She was promoted to the rank of soloist in October 2009, to first soloist in September 2011, to leading soloist in May 2012, and was appointed to the rank of principal dancer in July 2015.

Her guest appearances have included performing Kitri in Don Quixote with the Tokyo Ballet and Phrygia in Spartacus with the Royal Ballet of Flanders.

In 2018 Stashkevich received the Golden Mask theater award for her performance as the Novice in Jerome Robbins' The Cage.

== Repertoire ==
- La Sylphide (choreography: Johan Kobborg, after August Bournonville): Sylph, pas de six
- Giselle (choreography: Yuri Grigorovich, after Jean Coralli and Jules Perrot): Giselle, peasant pas de deux
- Giselle (choreography: Vladimir Vasiliev, after Jean Coralli and Jules Perrot): Giselle, pas d'action
- Coppélia (choreography: Sergei Vikharev, after Marius Petipa and Enrico Cecchetti): Swanilda, Dawn
- Swan Lake (choreography: Yuri Grigorovich, after Marius Petipa and Lev Ivanov): pas de trois, Neapolitan Bride
- The Sleeping Beauty (choreography: Yuri Grigorovich, after Marius Petipa): Canary, Princess Florine, Diamond Fairy, Red Riding Hood
- Raymonda (choreography: Yuri Grigorovich, after Marius Petipa): grand pas variation
- La Bayadère (choreography: Yuri Grigorovich, after Marius Petipa): first variation in the "Kingdom of the Shades"
- Don Quixote (choreography: Alexei Fadeyechev, after Marius Petipa and Alexander Gorsky): Kitri, Amour
- Don Quixote (choreography: Vladimir Vasiliev, after Marius Petipa and Alexander Gorsky): Kitri
- Le Corsaire (choreography: Yuri Burlaka and Alexei Ratmansky, after Marius Petipa): Gulnare, pas d'esclaves
- Esmeralda (choreography: Yuri Burlaka and Vasily Medvedev, after Marius Petipa): Esmeralda, Diana
- Paquita, grand pas (choreography: Yuri Burlaka, after Marius Petipa): solo variation, pas de trois
- La Fille mal gardée (choreography by Frederick Ashton): Lise
- Marco Spada (choreography: Pierre Lacotte): Angela, Bride
- The Pharaoh's Daughter (choreography: Pierre Lacotte): Ramzé, Fisherman's Wife, Guadalquivir
- The Nutcracker (choreography: Yuri Grigorovich): Marie
- Legend of Love (choreography: Yuri Grigorovich): Shirin
- Spartacus (choreography: Yuri Grigorovich): Phrygia
- Anyuta (choreography: Vladimir Vasiliev): Anyuta
- Cipollino (choreography: Genrikh Mayorov): Little Radish
- Onegin (choreography: John Cranko): Olga
- The Lady of the Camellias (choreography: John Neumeier): Olympia
- Anna Karenina (choreography: John Neumeier): Dolly (first interpreter at the Bolshoi)
- The Bright Stream (choreography: Alexei Ratmansky): Zina, Galya
- Flames of Paris (choreography: Alexei Ratmansky, after Vasily Vainonen): Adeline, Amour
- Lost Illusions (choreography: Alexei Ratmansky): Coralie
- Romeo and Juliet (choreography: Alexei Ratmansky): Juliet
- The Taming of the Shrew (choreography: Jean-Christophe Maillot): Bianca
- Hamlet (choreography: Radu Poklitaru): Ophelia (first interpreter)
- A Hero of Our Time (choreography: Yuri Possokhov): Mary, in "Princess Mary"
- Nureyev (choreography: Yuri Possokhov): Ballerina (first interpreter)
- Moydodyr (choreography: Yuri Smekalov): Fresh-as-a-Daisy
- Chopiniana (choreography: Michel Fokine): 11th Waltz
- Petrushka (choreography: Michel Fokine): Ballerina
- Apollo (choreography: George Balanchine): Calliope
- Glinka Pas de Trois (choreography: George Balanchine)
- Jewels (choreography: George Balanchine): Emeralds, Rubies
- The Cage (choreography: Jerome Robbins): Novice (first interpreter at the Bolshoi)
- L'Arlésienne (choreography: Roland Petit): Vivette
- In the Upper Room (choreography: Twyla Tharp)
- Jeu de cartes (choreography: Alexei Ratmansky)
- Russian Seasons (choreography: Alexei Ratmansky): Couple in Yellow, Couple in Claret
- Classical Symphony (choreography: Yuri Possokhov)
- Cinque (choreography: Mauro Bigonzetti)
- Dream of Dream (choreography: Jorma Elo; world premiere)
- Chroma (choreography: Wayne McGregor)

== Filmography ==
- Don Quixote (choreography: Alexei Fadeyechev), Bolshoi Ballet, 2011: as Amour
- Coppélia (choreography: Sergei Vikharev), Bolshoi Ballet, 2011: as Dawn
- Esmeralda (choreography: Yuri Burlaka and Vasily Medvedev), Bolshoi Ballet, 2011: as Diana, "Diana and Acteon"
- The Sleeping Beauty (choreography: Yuri Grigorovich), Bolshoi Ballet, 2011: as the Canary, Red Riding Hood
- Le Corsaire (choreography: Yuri Burlaka and Alexei Ratmansky), Bolshoi Ballet, 2012: pas d'esclaves
- Raymonda (choreography: Yuri Grigorovich), Bolshoi Ballet, 2012: grand pas variation
- La Bayadère (choreography: Yuri Grigorovich), Bolshoi Ballet, 2013: first variation, "Kingdom of the Shades"
- Jewels (choreography: George Balanchine), Bolshoi Ballet, 2014: "Emeralds"
- Marco Spada (choreography: Pierre Lacotte), Bolshoi Ballet, 2014: as the Bride
- The Cage (choreography: Jerome Robbins), Bolshoi Ballet, 2017: as the Novice
- Le Corsaire (choreography: Yuri Burlaka and Alexei Ratmansky), Bolshoi Ballet, 2017: pas d'esclaves
- La Sylphide (choreography: Johan Kobborg), Bolshoi Ballet, 2018: Sylph

== Awards and nominations ==
Year	Association	Category	Work	Result	Ref.
2018	Golden Mask	Ballet/Contemporary Dance – Best Actress	The Cage	Won	
2023	Golden Mask	Ballet/Contemporary Dance – Best Actress	Dancemania	Nominated	
