= Vyacheslav Lopatin =

Russian dancer (born 1984)

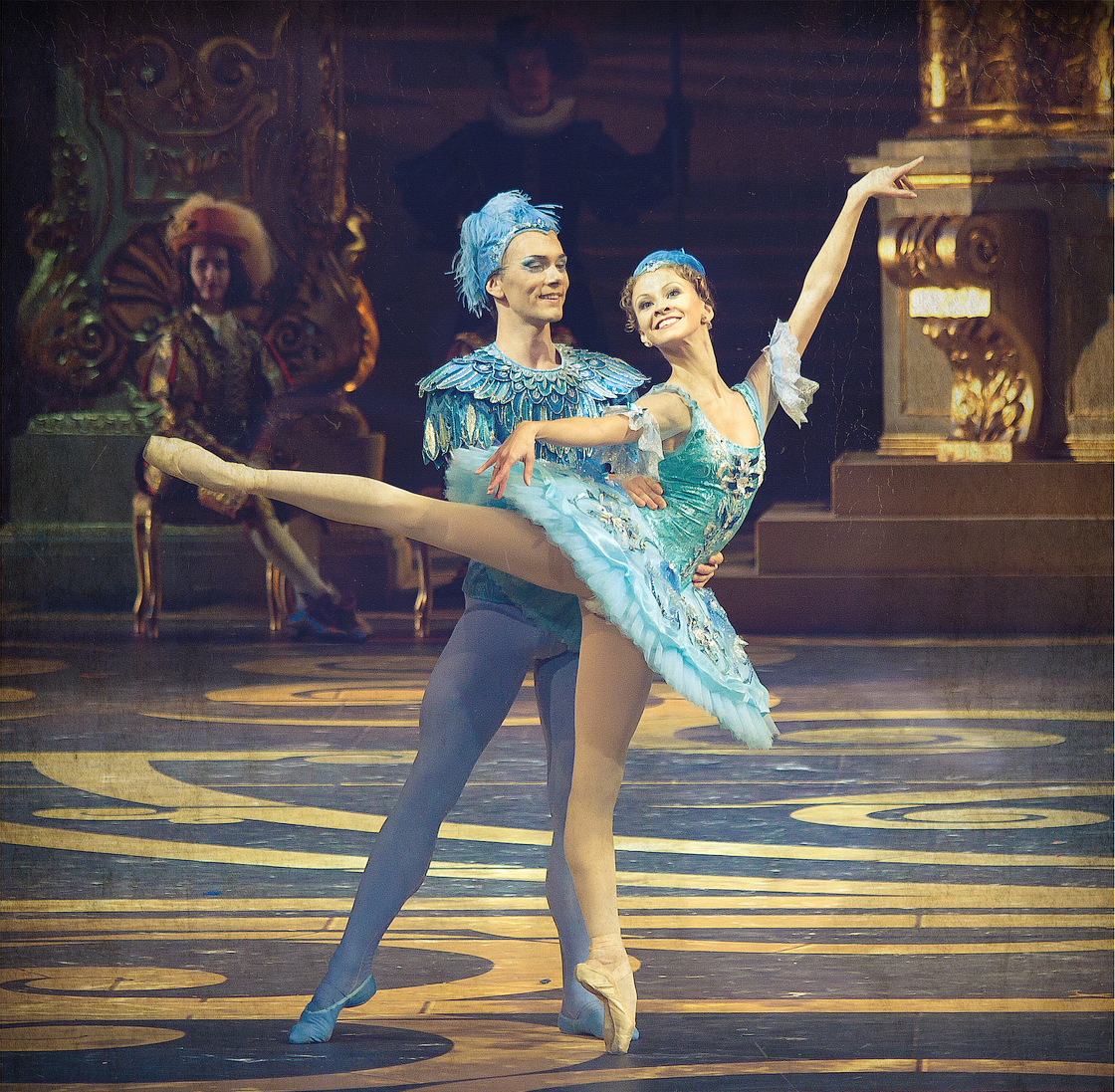
- Vyacheslav Lopatin as the Bluebird in The Sleeping Beauty, with Anastasia Stashkevich as Princess Florine. Bolshoi Theatre. 23 November 2011
- Born: Vyacheslav Mikhailovich Lopatin; 4 May 1984 (age 42); Voronezh, USSR (now Russia)
- Citizenship: Russian Federation
- Education: Voronezh Choreographic College, Moscow Choreographic Academy
- Occupation: Ballet dancer
- Years active: 2003 to present
- Employer: Bolshoi Theatre

Vyacheslav Mikhailovich Lopatin (Russian: Вячеслав Михайлович Лопатин; born 4 May 1984) is a Russian principal dancer with the Bolshoi Ballet.

Vyacheslav Lopatin was born in Voronezh, Russia, and studied at the Voronezh Choreographic College, after which he apprenticed at the Moscow Choreographic Academy. In 2003 he joined the Bolshoi Ballet, where he presently works under the tutelage of Boris Akimov. He was promoted to the rank of first soloist in October 2009, to leading soloist in September 2011 and appointed to the rank of principal dancer in July 2017.

In 2009 Lopatin and Natalia Osipova received a special prize from the jury of the Golden Mask award for their partnership in the Bolshoi's production of La Sylphide.

== Repertoire ==
- La Sylphide (choreography: Johan Kobborg, after August Bournonville): James
- Giselle (choreography: Vladimir Vasiliev, after Jean Coralli and Jules Perrot): Albrecht, pas d'action
- Giselle (choreography: Yuri Grigorovich, after Jean Coralli and Jules Perrot): peasant pas de deux
- Coppélia (choreography: Sergei Vikharev, after Marius Petipa and Enrico Cecchetti): Frantz
- Swan Lake (choreography: Yuri Grigorovich, after Marius Petipa and Lev Ivanov): Jester
- The Sleeping Beauty (choreography: Yuri Grigorovich, after Marius Petipa): Prince Désiré, Bluebird
- La Bayadère (choreography: Yuri Grigorovich, after Marius Petipa): Bronze Idol
- Don Quixote (choreography: Vladimir Vasiliev, after Marius Petipa and Alexander Gorsky): Basilio
- Le Corsaire (choreography: Yuri Burlaka and Alexei Ratmansky, after Marius Petipa): pas d'esclaves
- Esmeralda (choreography: Yuri Burlaka and Vasily Medvedev, after Marius Petipa): Acteon
- Paquita, grand pas (choreography: Yuri Burlaka, after Marius Petipa): pas de trois
- La Fille mal gardée (choreography by Frederick Ashton): Colas, Alain
- Marco Spada (choreography: Pierre Lacotte): Groom
- The Pharaoh's Daughter (choreography: Pierre Lacotte): Lord Wilson/Taor,
- The Nutcracker (choreography: Yuri Grigorovich): Nutcracker Prince, Harlequin
- Romeo and Juliet (choreography: Yuri Grigorovich): Mercutio
- The Golden Age (choreography: Yuri Grigorovich): Compere
- Anyuta (choreography: Vladimir Vasiliev): Modest Alexeyevich
- Cipollino (choreography: Genrikh Mayorov): Cipollino
- The Lady of the Camellias (choreography: John Neumeier): Count N. (first interpreter at the Bolshoi)
- The Bright Stream (choreography: Alexei Ratmansky): Pyotr, Accordionist
- Flames of Paris (choreography: Alexei Ratmansky, after Vasily Vainonen): Philippe, Jerome
- Lost Illusions (choreography: Alexei Ratmansky): Lucien
- Romeo and Juliet (choreography: Alexei Ratmansky): Romeo
- The Taming of the Shrew (choreography: Jean-Christophe Maillot): Gremio (first interpreter)
- Hamlet (choreography: Radu Poklitaru): Yorick
- A Hero of Our Time (choreography: Yuri Possokhov): Old Woman/Yanko in "Taman" (first interpreter), Pechorin, in "Princess Mary"
- Nureyev (choreography: Yuri Possokhov): Pupil/Letter to Rudi (first interpreter)
- Ondine (choreography: Viacheslav Samodurov): the Fugitive
- The Winter's Tale (choreography: Christopher Wheeldon): Florizel
- Petrushka (choreography: Michel Fokine): Petrushka
- Études (choreography: Harald Lander)
- Glinka Pas de Trois (choreography: George Balanchine)
- Tarantella (choreography: George Balanchine)
- Jewels (choreography: George Balanchine): Emeralds, Rubies (Bolshoi premiere)
- In the Upper Room (choreography: Twyla Tharp)
- Herman Schmerman (choreography: William Forsythe)
- Forgotten Land (choreography: Jiří Kylián): Couple in Red
- Class Concert (choreography: Asaf Messerer)
- Jeu de cartes (choreography: Alexei Ratmansky; Bolshoi premiere)
- Russian Seasons (choreography: Alexei Ratmansky): Couple in Yellow, Couple in Claret
- Misericordes (choreography: Christopher Wheeldon; world premiere)
- Classical Symphony (choreography: Yuri Possokhov)
- Remanso (choreography: Nacho Duato)
- Chroma (choreography: Wayne McGregor; Bolshoi premiere)
- Faun (choreography: Sidi Larbi Cherkaoui; Bolshoi premiere)

== Filmography ==
- Coppélia (choreography: Sergei Vikharev), Bolshoi Ballet, 2011: as Frantz
- The Lady of the Camellias (choreography: John Neumeier), Bolshoi Ballet, 2015: as Count N.
- The Taming of the Shrew (choreography: Jean-Christophe Maillot), Bolshoi Ballet, 2016: as Gremio
- The Golden Age (choreography: Yuri Grigorovich), Bolshoi Ballet, 2016: as the Compere
- A Hero of Our Time (choreography: Yuri Possokhov), Bolshoi Ballet, 2017: as Yanko
