= Andrey Remnev =

Russian painter

Andrey Remnev (Андрей Владимирович Ремнёв) (born 1962, Yakhroma, Russian Soviet Federated Socialist Republic) is a contemporary Russian painter.

Remnev's paintings are characterized by their use of Russian folk and religious motifs, their Byzantine colour palette, and his Escher-like use of pattern and visual illusions.

== Biography ==
Remnev was born into a family of doctors. In 1983, he graduated from the Moscow Academic Art School (then known as the Moscow State College of Fine Arts in Memory of the 1905 Uprising). He later completed a degree at the V. I. Surikov Moscow State Art Institute, where he was one of the first to write a thesis on a religion-related theme.

In 1996 he began an eight-year study of icon painting under the guidance of the icon painter Fr. Vyacheslav (Savinykh) in Andronikov Monastery. He continued to implement religious themes in his work between 2000 and 2010. Remnev painted the ceiling fresco of the chapel at Andronikov Monastery, as well as the large icon for the Diveyevo Convent.

== Work ==
Remnev's work combines methods and motifs from Russian icon painting, Russian artworks of the 18th century, and Russian constructivism. He also regularly utilizes motifs from heraldry. His work utilizes medieval painting techniques, and are mostly painted using self-made egg tempera.

In the mid-2010s, Remnev began completing work based on contemporary Russian ballet dancers. In 2017, a large series of sketches was made in Perm during a ballet performance of Stravinsky's works at the Diaghilev Festival; some of these works were published in a program released by the theatre. At the invitation of principal dancer Artem Ovcharenko and ballerina Olga Smirnova, Remnev began painting in the workshop and behind the stage of the Bolshoi Ballet, and he completed a series of works based on a staging of John Neumeier’s "La Dame aux Camélias". He also made sketches from the rehearsals of the orchestra MusicAeterna, as well as portraits of Teodor Currentzis, Natalia Osipova, Olga Smirnova, Artem Ovcharenko, B. B. Akimov, Oksana Kardash, and David Motta Soares. A separate series of works was also devoted to Diaghilev.

Remnev also works as a private portraitist.

Solo exhibitions of Remnev's work have been held in Moscow, Ryazan, Sergiyev Posad, Dmitrov, the Hague, and Trenton (New Jersey). He served as artistic director and jury member of the "Russian Spring" International Youth Festival (Bavaria 2012, Barcelona 2013, Paris 2014). He is a professor at Surikov's Moscow State Art Institute and an honorary member of the International Academy of Culture and Art.

The Fall/Winter 2015 collection of the Spanish fashion house Delpozo was inspired by Remnev's works. The Spring/Summer 2018 collection of the Italian fashion label Vivetta was created in collaboration with the artist.

== Bibliography ==
- Александр Шестимиров. «Андрей Ремнев». М., Белый город, 2006. ISBN 5-7793-0987-6
