= Maria Allash =

Russian ballet dancer

Maria Yevgenevna Allash
- Мария Евгеньевна Аллаш
- Born: March 9, 1976 (age 49); Moscow, Russian SFSR, Soviet Union
- Occupation: Ballet dancer
- Years active: 1994–present
- Notable work: La Bayadère, Swan Lake, Don Quixote, Spartacus
- Spouse: Alexei Loparevich
- Awards: Honoured Artist of Russia (2002); People's Artist of Russia (2012)
- Career
- Current group: Bolshoi Ballet

Maria Yevgenevna Allash (Russian: Мария Евгеньевна Аллаш) (born 9 March 1976) is a Russian ballet dancer, and principal dancer of the Bolshoi Ballet since 1994.

Born in Moscow, then part of the Russian Soviet Federative Socialist Republic, in the Soviet Union, Allash joined the Moscow State Academy of Choreography, under the tutelage of Professor Sofia Golovkina. Since 1994 she has been a soloist of the Bolshoi Theatre. She has been tutored at different times by Tatyana Golikova and Nina Semizorova. She is married to fellow Bolshoi soloist Alexei Loparevich. She has been honoured with the titles Honoured Artist of Russia, in 2002, and People's Artist of Russia in 2012. Allash retired from the stage in 2020. Since 2018 she has been a ballet mistress at the Bolshoi.

== Repertoire ==
Allash's first appearance was in 1994, dancing the mazurka in the eleventh waltz in Chopiniana. The following year she appeared as the Dryad ruler in Don Quixote, as Countess Cherry in Cipollino, as Mirta in Giselle and as Aegina in Spartacus. Allash has gone on to appear in a number of ballet productions, including La Bayadère, The Sleeping Beauty, Swan Lake, Raymonda, Mozartiana, The Legend of Love, The Little Humpbacked Horse, Symphony in C, The Golden Age, A Midsummer Night's Dream, La Esmeralda, Paquita and Jewels.

== Tours ==
In 2006 Allash participated in the festival "Stars of the Bolshoi Ballet", staged at the Krasnoyarsk State Opera and Ballet Theatre, and performed as Gamzatti in La Bayadère and Kitri in Don Quixote. She again performed in Krasnoyarsk in 2007, once more in La Bayadère, this time as Nikiya, and as Aegina in Spartacus, choreographed by Yury Grigorovich. Later that year she performed at a gala concert at the Royal Opera House in London in honour of the 80th birthday of Yury Grigorovich. Allash performed at the Kazan International Classical Ballet Festival in 2008, appearing at the Tatar Academic Opera and Ballet Theatre as Odette/Odile in Swan Lake, and as Fairy Lilacs in The Sleeping Beauty. Allash participated in the XIII Festival of Classical Ballet in 2016, reprising her role as Nikiya in La Bayadère at the Samara Academic Opera and Ballet Theatre.
