= Denis Savin =

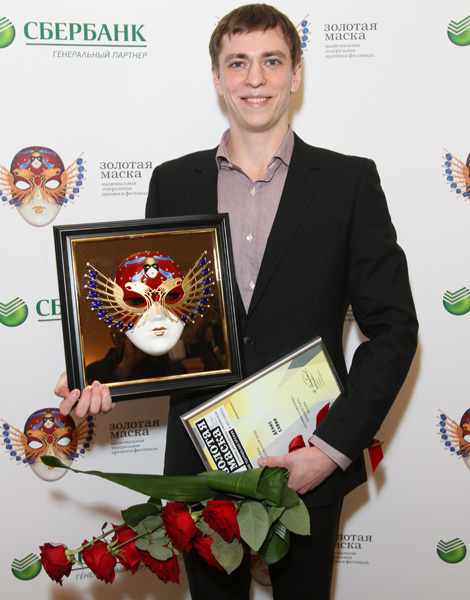
Denis Savin

Denis Savin (Russian: Денис Савин) is a principal dancer with the Bolshoi Ballet in Russia, and is a 2012 recipient of the Golden Mask award.

== Early life and career ==
Savin was born Moscow. In 2002 he graduated from Moscow State Academy of Choreography where his teacher was Igor Uksusnikov. Following the graduation he worked as a solo dancer in Corps de Ballet of the Bolshoi Theater. In 2003 he appeared in his first leading role, playing as Romeo in Romeo and Juliet, a ballet which was produced by Declan Donnelan and choreographed by Radu Poklitaru. Three years later he took part in Studio of New Choreography where he appeared in a play called Acquisition along with Anna Nikulina and in 2007 appeared in a ballet called Old Ladies Falling Out with the same project at the Territory Festival.

== Repertoire ==
- 2002 — Giselle — Pas d’action
- 2002 — Raymonda — Grand Pas
- 2002 — Cipollino — Prince Lemon
- 2003 — The Bright Stream — highlander
- 2004 — The Sleeping Beauty — Grey Wolf
- 2004 — The Nutcracker — The Mouse King
- 2004 — Ward # 6 — patient
- 2004 — A Midnight's Summer Dream — moth
- 2005 — A Midnight's Summer Dream — Lysander
- 2005 — The Bolt — Denis
- 2005 — Jeu de cards — soloist
- 2006 — Lea — Hannan
- 2006 — The Golden Age — sailor
- 2007 — Legend of Love — officers
- 2007 — Don Quixote — Gamache
- 2007 — In the Upper Room — soloist
- 2007 — The Bright Stream — Pyotr
- 2008 — La Sylphide — Gurn
- 2008 — Spartacus — shepherd
- 2008 — La Fille du Pharaon — slave
- 2008 — Flames of Paris — Jerome
- 2008 — Russian Seasons — Couple in red
- 2008 — Nutcracker — Drosselmeyer
- 2009 — Giselle — Hilarion
- 2009 — Coppélia — Csardas
- 2009 — Zakharova Super Game — delta
- 2009 — Spartacus — gladiator
- 2009 — La Esmeralda — Gringoire
- 2010 — Petrushka — moor
- 2010 — Herman Schmerman — Pas de deux
- 2010 — Chroma
- 2011 — Giselle — Hans
- 2012 — Anyuta — Artynov
- 2012 — Le Corsaire — Birbanto
- 2012 — Carmen Suite — Torero
- 2012 — Dream of Dream — duet
- 2012 — Moydodyr — Chimney-sweep
- 2013 — La Bayadère — dance with a drum
- 2013 — The Sleeping Beauty — Evil Fairy Carabosse
- 2013 — Kvartira — Bidet
- 2013 — Romeo and Juliet — Tybalt
- 2013 — Marco Spada — Pepinelli
- 2014 — Raymonda — Abderakhman
- 2014 — The Taming of the Shrew — Petruchio
- 2014 — Legend of Love — Vizier
- 2015 — Hamlet — Hamlet
