= Kretov =

Kretov (Russian: Кретов) is a Slavic masculine surname, its feminine counterpart is Kretova. Notable people with the surname include:

- Anatoli Kretov (born 1976), Russian footballer
- Kristina Kretova (born 1984), Russian ballerina
- Stepan Kretov (1919–1975), Soviet military aviator
