= David Motta Soares =

Brazilian classical ballet dancer (born 1997)

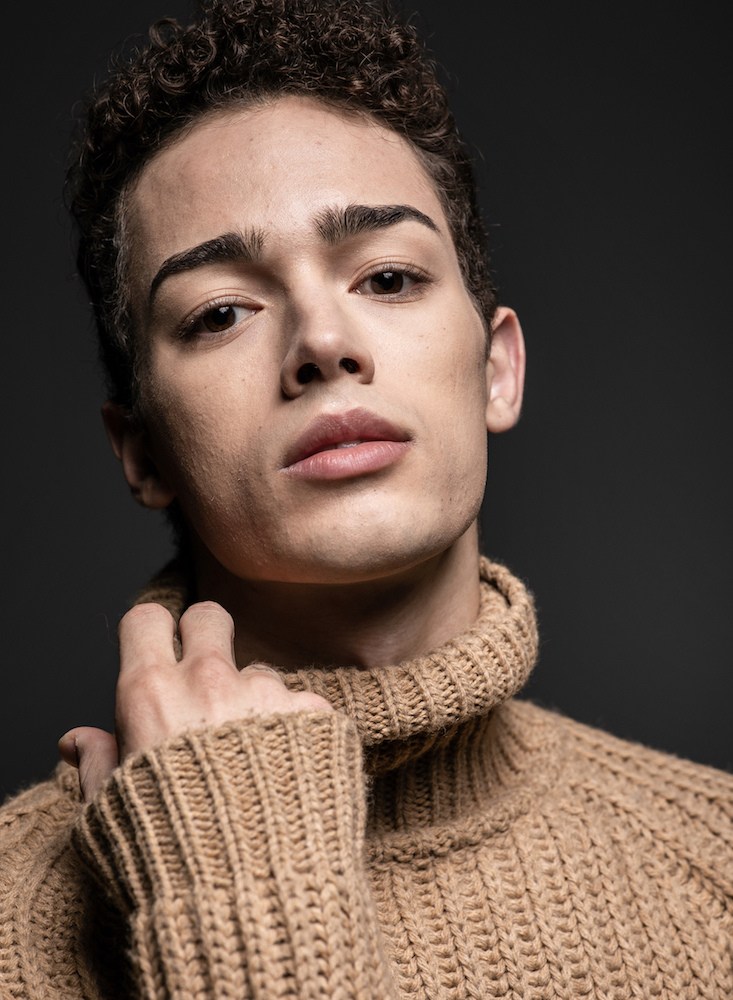
- Born: 13 March 1997 (age 29); Cabo Frio, Brazil
- Education: Bolshoi Ballet Academy
- Occupation: ballet dancer
- Years active: 2015 to present
- Height: 183 cm (6 ft 0 in)

David Motta Soares (born 13 March 1997) is a Brazilian classical ballet dancer. He was a leading soloist with the Bolshoi Ballet. In May 2022 David became a Principal Dancer with the Berlin State Ballet.

== Biography ==
Born in Cabo Frio, David Motta Soares began his dance studies at the Regina and Ofelia Corvello Ballet School in 2007. After the Youth America Grand Prix competition in New York, he was invited to attend the Annual Bolshoi Ballet Academy Summer Intensive in Middlebury, Connecticut in 2010. At the age of 12 he left Brazil for Moscow to enter the Bolshoi Ballet Academy. Whilst a student, he performed in Harlequinade, Nacho Duato's «L’amoroso», and danced the Grand Pas Classique (music by Daniel Auber, choreography by Victor Gzovsky). In 2014 David performed as Colas in «La Fille mal gardée» at the stage of the Bolshoi Theatre and participated in the academy's tour to Milan and Rome. At his graduation concert he danced the pas de deux from «Don Quixote».

He graduated in 2015 and was accepted in the Bolshoi Ballet as a member of the corps de ballet. Within two years, with Vladimir Nikonov as mentor, he was given the leading roles in the ballets «Giselle», «The Nutcracker», and «Swan Lake» as well as taking part in the Bolshoi contemporary productions.

David has participated in the Bolshoi Ballet tours to Europe, Asia, America and Australia.

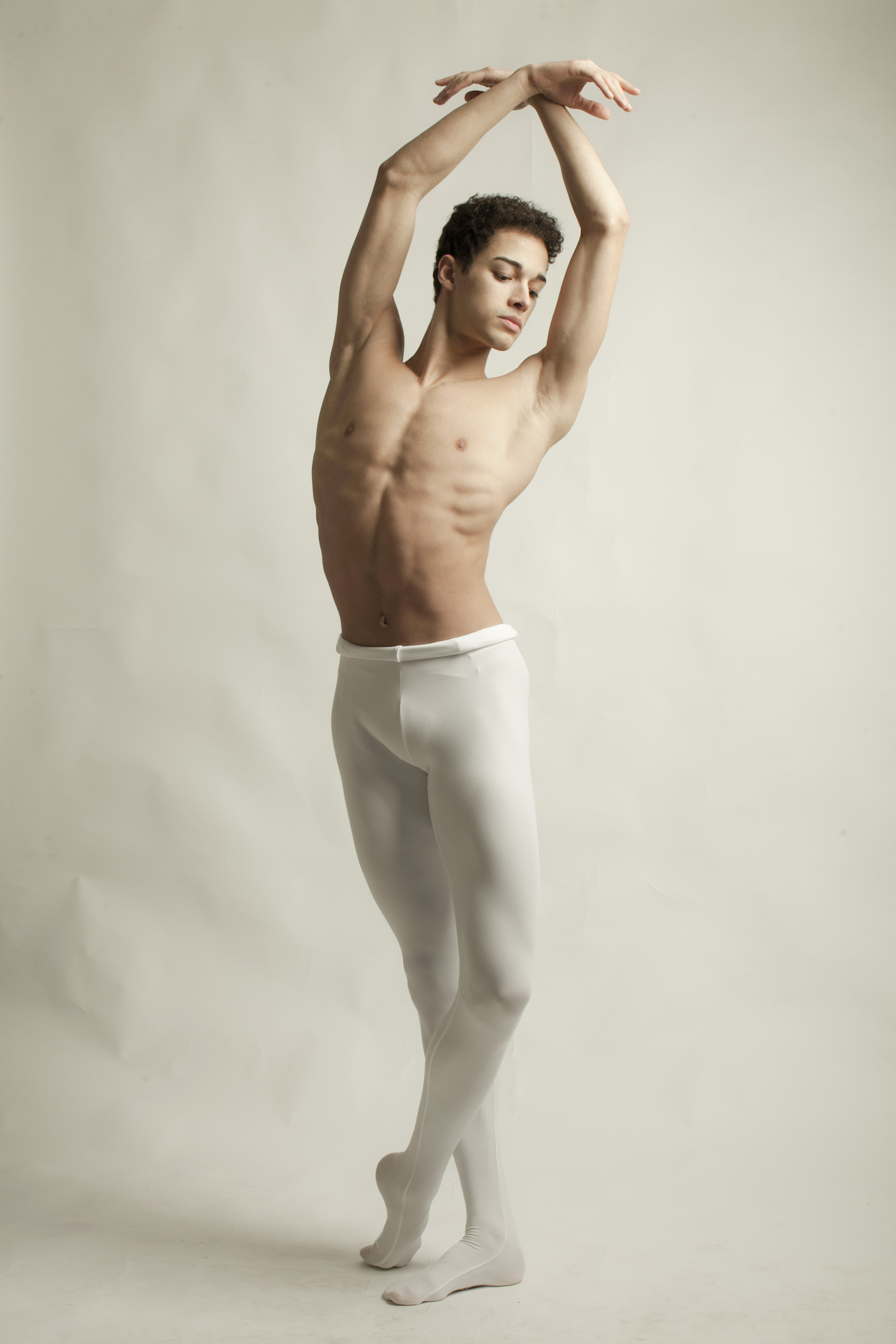
David Motta Soares — 2018

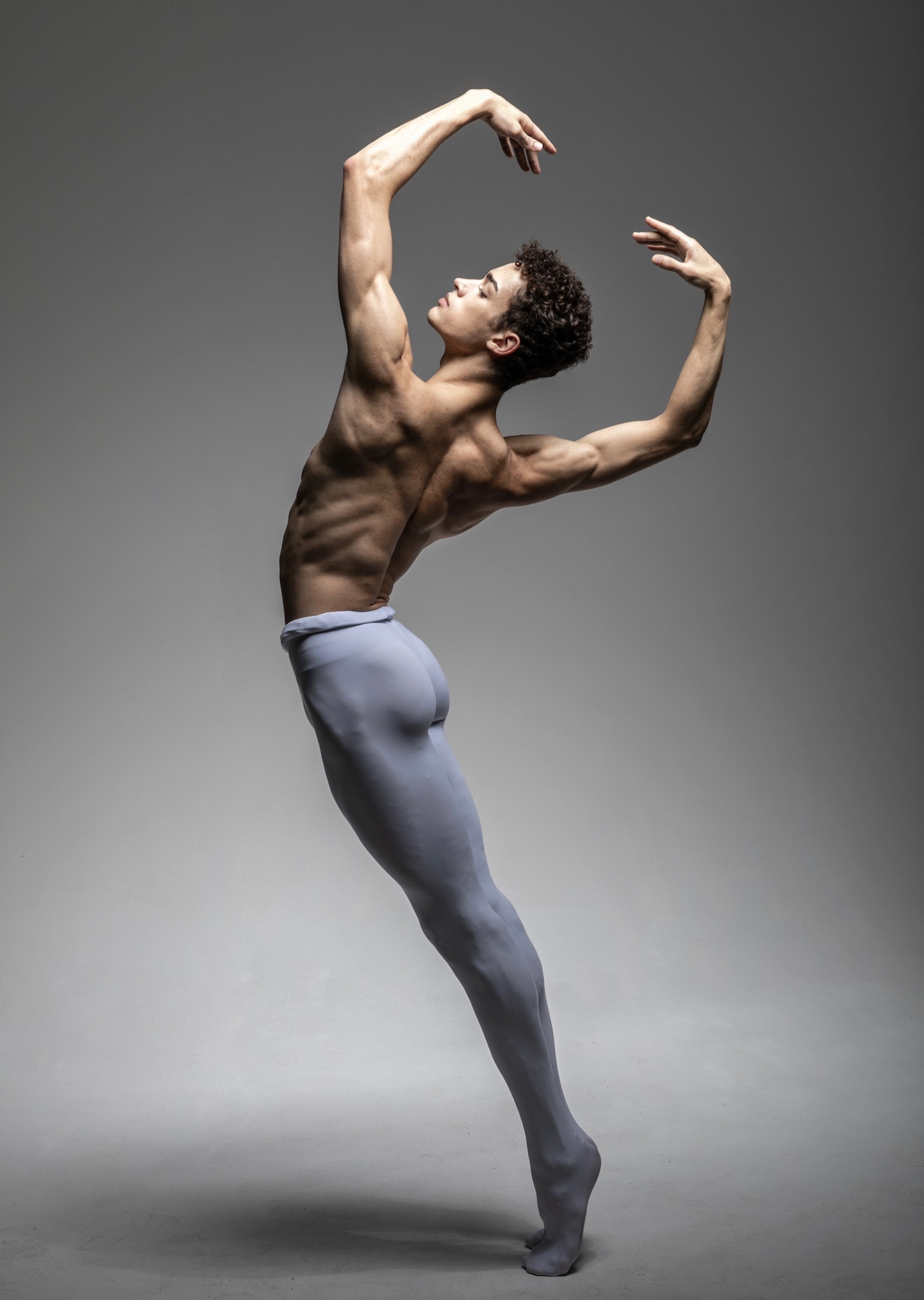
David Motta Soares — 2019

== Roles ==
=== With the Bolshoi Theatre ===
2015

- French Doll in The Nutcracker, Yuri Grigorovich's production

2016

- Piggy-Wiggy in Moidodyr (Wash'em Clean), Yuri Smekalov's production
- Grand Pas and Bernard in Raymonda, Yuri Grigorovich's production
- Count Albrecht in Giselle, Yuri Grigorovich's production
- Juliet's Friend in Romeo and Juliet, Yuri Grigorovich's production
- Soloist in George Balanchine's Diamonds
- Leading dancer in George Balanchine's Emeralds
- The Bronze Idol in La Bayadère, choreography by Marius Petipa, Yuri Grigorovich's version
- Pechorin in A Hero of Our Time (Part 2 "Taman"), choreography by Yuri Possokhov
- The Prince in The Nutcracker, Yuri Grigorovich's production

2017

- Principal Dancer in Etudes, Harold Lander's production
- Pechorin in A Hero of Our Time (Part 1 "Bela"), choreography by Yuri Possokhov
- Antoine Mistral in Flames of Paris, choreography by Alexei Ratmansky with use of the original choreography by Vasily Vainonen
- The Evil Genius in Swan Lake, Yuri Grigorovich's production with use of the original choreography by Marius Petipa
- Torero in Carmen Suite, choreography by Alberto Alonso
- Grand Gala in Nureyev, choreography by Yuri Possokhov, designed and directed by Kirill Serebrennikov

2018

- Frantz in Coppélia, revival and new version by Sergei Vikharev
- Fisherman in The Pharaoh's Daughter, Pierre Lacotte's production
- Basilio in Don Quixote, Alexei Fadeyechev's production
- Moor in Petrushka, Edward Clug's production
- Two couples in Artifact suite, William Forsythe's production
- Romeo in Romeo and Juliet, Alexei Ratmansky's production

2019

- Lord Wilson-Taor in The Pharaoh's Daughter, Pierre Lacotte's production
- Florizel, prince of Bohemia in The Winter's Tale, Christopher Wheeldon's production
- Ballet Dancer in The Bright Stream, Alexei Ratmansky's production
- Friend to Ferkhad in A Legend of Love, Yuri Grigorovich's production
- Leading Soloist of Parts III and IV, Soloist of Part I and IV in Symphony in C, George Balanchine's production
- Lover and Bim's friend in Gaîté Parisienne, Maurice Béjart's production
- Leading dancer in George Balanchine's Rubies

2020

- Roles in The Ninth Wave, choreography by Bryan Arias — appeared in the opening night performance
- Soloist in the Silentium, choreography by Martin Chaix — appeared in the opening night performance
- Espada in Don Quixote, Alexei Fadeyechev's production
- Blue Bird in The Sleeping Beauty, new version by Yuri Grigorovich
- Count Albrecht in Giselle, Alexei Ratmansky's production

2021

- Boys, Cavalier Orlando, and five other roles in Orlando, Christian Spuck's production — appeared in the opening night performance
- Ferkhad in A Legend of Love, Yuri Grigorovich's production
- Shelmerdine / Elizabeth I in Orlando, Christian Spuck's production

2022

- James in La Sylphide, choreography by August Bournonville in a version by Johan Kobborg

=== With the Berlin State Opera ===
2022

- Prince Desiré in The Sleeping Beauty, choreography by Marcia Haydée after Marius Petipa
- Count Albrecht in Giselle, choreography Patrice Bart after Jean Coralli and Jules Perrot
- Prince Siegfried in Swan Lake, choreography by Patrice Bart

2023

- Soloist in Voices, choreography by David Dawson
- Soloist in Messa da Requiem, choreography by Christian Spuck
- Carabosse in The Sleeping Beauty, choreography by Marcia Haydée after Marius Petipa
- Rival in Petrushka, choreography by Marco Goecke
- Rodolphe Boulanger in Bovary, choreography by Christian Spuck

2024

- Soloist in Approximate Sonata 2016, choreography by William Forsythe
- Soloist in Blake Works I, choreography by William Forsythe

2026

- Nureyev in Nureyev, choreography by Yuri Possokhov, designed and directed by Kirill Serebrennikov
- Leading Soloist in Symphony in C, George Balanchine's production

=== As Guest Star ===
2022

- Prince Siegfried in Swan Lake, Jorge Texeira's production with use of the original choreography by Marius Petipa — Theatro Municipal Ballet, Rio de Janeiro, Brazil (partner — Cláudia Mota).

=== Tours ===
2017

Tour of the Bolshoi Ballet at the Biwako Hall Center for the Performing Arts, Otsu and Tokyo Bunka Kaikan, Tokyo, Japan

- Antoine Mistral (Flames of Paris, choreography by Alexei Ratmansky with use of the original choreography by Vasily Vainonen) — debut

2018

Tour of the Bolshoi Ballet at the National Centre for the Performing Arts, Beijing, China:

- Pas des esclaves (Le Corsaire, choreography by Alexei Ratmansky and Yury Burlaka)
- Antoine Mistral (Flames of Paris, choreography by Alexei Ratmansky with use of the original choreography by Vasily Vainonen)

Tour of the Bolshoi Ballet at the Seoul Arts Center, Seoul, Korea:

- The Evil Genius in Swan Lake (production by Yuri Grigorovich)

Tour of the Bolshoi Ballet at the Aspendos theatre, Turkey:

- Pas de deux from The Talisman
- Pas de deux from Coppelia

2019

Tour of the Bolshoi Ballet at the Queensland Performing Arts Centre, Brisbane, Australia:

- Leading dancer in Emeralds and Rubies, soloist in Diamonds (choreography by George Balanchine)

Tour of the Bolshoi Ballet at the Royal Opera House, London, UK:

- The Evil Genius in Swan Lake (production by Yuri Grigorovich)
- Basilio in Don Quixote (production by Alexei Fadeyechev)

== Filmography ==
- 2019 — as The Bronze Idol in La Bayadère, broadcast by Pathé Live from the Bolshoi Theater.

== Awards ==
- 2014 — 2nd prize at the V International Yury Grigorovich Competition «Young Ballet of the World» in Sochi
- 2015 — 1st prize at the II All-Russia Young Dancer's Competition Russian Ballet.
- 2019 — Nominated for the National theatre award “The Golden Mask” as the best actor in Ballet/Contemporary Dance.
