= Ekaterina Shipulina =

- Born: November 14, 1979 (age 45); Perm, USSR
- Occupation: ballet dancer
- Career
- Current group: Bolshoi Ballet

Ekaterina Valentinovna Shipulina (Russian: Екатерина Валентиновна Шипулина, born 14 November 1979) is a Russian principal dancer of the Bolshoi Ballet and a People's Artist of Russia.

== Biography ==
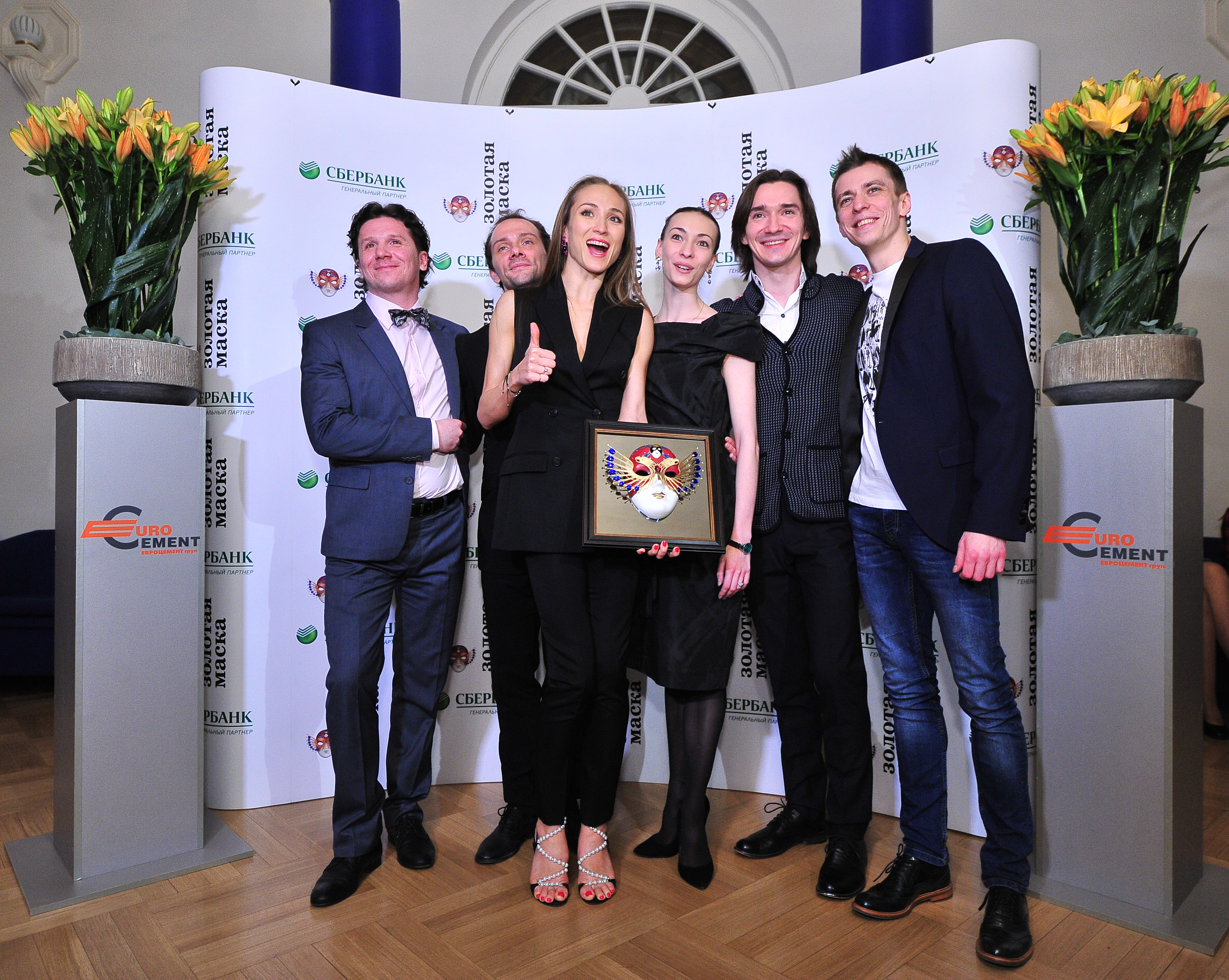
Vyacheslav Lopatin, Ekaterina Shipulina, Marianna Ryzhkina, Vladislav Lantratov, Denis Savin.jpg

Shipulina was born to a ballet family in Perm, Russia where she also went to Perm Choreographic College in 1989. In 1994 she went to the Moscow College of Choreography from which she graduated by 1998 and then joined Bolshoi Theatre same year. In 1999 she won second place at the International Ballet Competition in Luxembourg and got the same place in 2001 in Moscow. In 2004 she was awarded with the Soul of Dance prize by the Ballet magazine and the same year played a role of Kitri in Don Quixote. During the same year she also participated in both Symphony in C and Magrittomania where was a soloist and played a role of Aegina in Spartacus. In 2005 she joined John Neumeier's A Midsummer Night's Dream where she played a role of Hermia. Later on, she redid the same Symphony in 2008 and participated in the Christopher Wheeldon's Misericordes. Prior to all of it, in 2001 she played in Yuri Grigorovich's adaptation of the Swan Lake called Three Swans and next year did the same in a play called Odette-Odile which was another adaptation. In 2011 she participated in Barton's play called Dumka.

== Repertoire ==
- Giselle Giselle, Myrtha
- The Little Humpbacked Horse — Little Humpbacked Horse
- Don Quixote — Kitri, Dryad
- The Sleeping Beauty — Lilac fairy, Gold fairy
- The Pharaoh's Daughter — Congo River
- La Bayadère — Gamzatti, Shade
- Swan Lake — Odette - Odile
- Raymonda — Henriette
- Les Sylphides
- Notre-Dame de Paris — Esmeralda
- Spartacus — Aegina
- A Midsummer Night's Dream — Hermia
- Cinderella — Cinderella
- La Légende de l'amour — Mekhmene Banu
- Le Corsaire — Medora, Gulnare
- Flames of Paris — Jeanne
- La Esmeralda
- Illusions perdues — Florine

== Awards ==
- 2009: Merited Artist of the Russian Federation
- 2018: People's Artist of Russia
