= Kristina Kretova =

Russian soloist of the Bolshoi Ballet (born 1984)

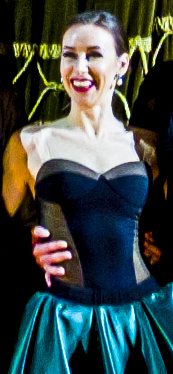
Kristina Kretova

Kristina Aleksandrovna Kretova (Russian: Кристина Александровна Кретова; born 28 January 1984) is a Russian soloist of the Bolshoi Ballet.

== Biography ==
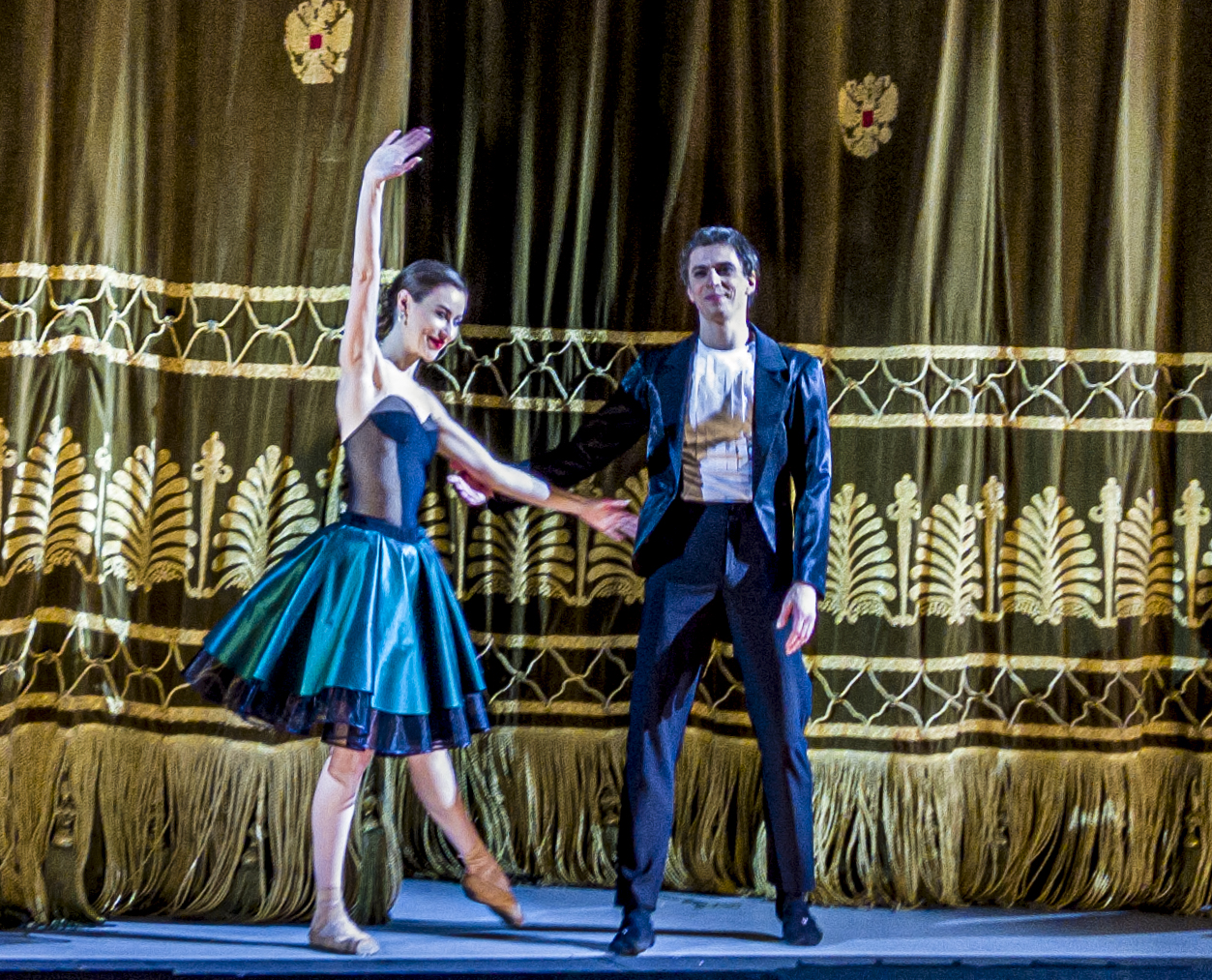
Kretova and Denis Savin after The Taming of the Shrew (2022)

Kretova was born in Oryol, Russia. She was a graduate of the Moscow State Choreographic Academy in 2002 and after it joined the Kremlin Ballet where she plays such roles as Odette-Odile in Swan Lake, Kitri in Don Quixote, Marie in the Nutcracker, and Emmy Lawrence in Tom Sawyer. She also played a double role of both Princesses Florina and Aurora in The Sleeping Beauty and also played roles of main characters such as Giselle in the play of the same name and Esmeralda in La Esmeralda. In 2011 she became soloist of the Bolshoi Ballet company. Dancing'Don Quixote' she played a role of Queen of Dryads and the same year replayed her previous roles from the Nutcracker and Giselle. In 2012 she reprised her role in Swan Lake, and the same year became a part of the slaves' dance in Le Corsaire.

In 2017 she is playing the part of Giselle in the Bolshoi's production of Adolphe Adam's Giselle - a ballet in two acts opposite Denis Rodkin who plays Count Albrecht.
