= Mikhail Lobukhin =

Mikhail Lobukhin (Russian: Михаил Лобухин) is a Russian principal dancer of the Bolshoi Ballet.

He was born in Saint Petersburg, Russia. In 2002 he graduated from Vaganova Ballet Academy with a bachelor's degree in arts and the same year joined Marinsky Theatre. Eight years later he joined Bolshoi Ballet where he played many solo roles but also appeared as a young man at the Leningrad Symphony, prince in Cinderella, Daphnis in Daphnis and Chloe, and Ivan the Fool at the Little Humpbacked Horse among others. In 2010 her appeared as Basilio in the Don Quixote which was performed at the Novosibirsk State Academic Opera and Ballet Theatre and next year played a role of a Bahram Shah in Seven Beauties at the Azerbaijan State Academic Opera and Ballet Theatre.
