= Irek Mukhamedov =

Soviet dancer, ballet teacher and pedagog (born 1960)

Irek Dzhavdatovich Mukhamedov OBE (Russian: Ирек Джавдатович Мухамедов: Tatar: Ирек Җәүдәт улы Мөхәммәтев; born 8 March 1960), is a Soviet-born British ballet dancer of Tatar origin who has danced with the Bolshoi Ballet and the Royal Ballet. Born in Kazan, he trained at the Moscow Choreographic Institute under the guidance of Alexander Prokofiev between 1970 and 1978. Upon graduation, he joined the Classical Ballet Company, where he spent three years touring around the world. It was with this company that he first danced Romeo, a role that was to become one of his most acclaimed. In 1981 he won the Grand Prix and gold medal at the International Ballet Competition in Moscow and was immediately invited to join the Bolshoi Ballet as a principal dancer, where he not only became Grigorovich's favourite danseur but went to become the youngest man ever to dance the leading role in Spartacus.

After defecting from the Soviet Union in 1990, he became a Senior Principal Dancer with the Royal Ballet in London, remaining with the company for many years and dancing lead roles in the classic ballets as well as the English repertoire. He was appointed an Officer of the Order of the British Empire for services to dance in the 2000 New Year Honours.

== Career ==
For nine years he was the Bolshoi's leading male dancer. His repertoire included Ivan the Terrible, Don Quixote, Swan Lake, Romeo and Juliet, Giselle, Raymonda and Legend of Love. Yury Grigorovich created the leading role in The Golden Age for him in 1984. His international tours with the Bolshoi earned him a huge fan-base and in 1988 he was awarded the Hans Christian Andersen Prize for Best Dancer in the World.

In 1990, he defected from the Soviet Union to the United Kingdom, not for artistic or political purposes, but because his wife was pregnant and they wanted a better life for his child. The family were mentored by Tamara Tchinarova and he joined The Royal Ballet in London, where he soon became a favourite of resident choreographer Kenneth MacMillan, who helped him to develop his dramatic range. MacMillan created Winter Dreams (based on Chekhov's The Three Sisters) for him and Darcey Bussell which was subsequently filmed for television and transmitted on the BBC at Christmas 1992. He appeared on numerous television shows and was subject of a one-hour Omnibus documentary in 1991.

Mukhamedov distinguished himself for his wide repertory. At The Royal Ballet he danced the traditional classics such as The Nutcracker, Raymonda Act III, La Bayadère, Swan Lake and Giselle, and he also gave unforgettable performances in more contemporary works. He performed both male leading roles in MacMillan's Manon, danced Colas in Ashton's La Fille Mal Gardée, and in 1992 created the leading male role in Macmillan's The Judas Tree, opposite Viviana Durante, who was widely considered his finest Royal Ballet partner.

His 1992 debut in Macmillan's Romeo and Juliet was met with universal acclaim, as also his debut in Mayerling (which was filmed for television). In 1993 he danced in Balanchine's Apollo and in The Prodigal Son. Ashley Page created the lead role in Fearful Symmetries for him (1994), and in 1995 Twyla Tharp was so impressed by his talent that she chose him for one of the lead roles in her first full-length ballet for The Royal Ballet, Mr. Worldly Wise.

In 1999, he appeared for the second time with Arc Dance Company where Kim Brandstrup created the leading role in The Return of Don Juan for him. The same year saw him create the role of Peter Quint in William Tuckett's ballet The Turn of the Screw. In 2001 he was invited to make a special guest appearance in Lorka Massine's Zorba with the Ballet of Teatr Wielki in Warsaw.

He was voted Dancer of the Year (1992) by the readers of the prestigious British magazine Dance and Dancers (only the third ever male recipient of the award) and in the same year was voted Dancer of the Year by The Independent On Sunday. Still in the same year he won the London Evening Standard Award for Dance and the Gino Tani Dance Award in Italy. He was also awarded the Prix Benois de la Danse in Paris in 1996, and in 1998 he received the Nijinsky Medal and was invited to become President of the Legat Society. In January 2000 he was awarded the OBE in the New Years Honours List.

In April 1992, Mukhamedov led his own small group of Royal Ballet dancers called Irek Mukhamedov and Company, which performed in England and Spain. For the London season, Mukhamedov invited Kim Brandstrup and Arc Theatre Company to join him. Kim Brandstrup created a new ballet for Mukhamedov, Othello, in which for the first time he danced with a contemporary dance company. Othello subsequently received the Evening Standard Award for Dance.

In 2001, the Ballet of Teatr Wielki, Warsaw premiered his production of Swan Lake, a new conception of the ballet which saw the introduction of his own choreography, including a new pas de deux for the Prince and Odette in the last act.

Mukhamedov stopped dancing regularly in 2004, but returned to the stage in the mid-2010s.

Mukhamedov danced the role of the baker in the 2021 ballet film, Coppelia, a modern adaptation of the E.T.A. Hoffmann story combining live dance with animation. His daughter, Sasha Mukhamedov, also performed in the same film.

== Repertoire ==
- Franz in Coppélia, Moscow Choreographic School, Moscow, 1978.
- Tybalt, Romeo and Juliet, Moscow Classical Ballet, 1978–81.
- Romeo, Romeo and Juliet, Moscow Classical Ballet, 1978–81.
- Pas de deux, Carnival in Venice (from Santanilla), Moscow Classical Ballet, 1978–81.
- Diana and Acteon (pas de deux), Esmeralda, Moscow Classical Ballet, 1978–81.
- Basil, Don Quixote Pas de Deux, Moscow Classical Ballet, 1978–81.
- Conrad, Le Corsaire Pas de Deux, Moscow Classical Ballet, 1978–81.
- Colin, Lise and Colin; ou, La Fille mal gardée, Moscow Classical Ballet, 1980.
- Title role, Spartacus, Bolshoi Ballet, Moscow, 1981.
- Basil, Don Quixote, Bolshoi Ballet, 1981.
- Title role, Ivan the Terrible, Bolshoi Ballet, 1982.
- Romeo, Romeo and Juliet, Bolshoi Ballet, 1983.
- Boris, The Golden Age, Bolshoi Ballet, 1984.
- Jean de Brienne, Raymonda, Bolshoi Ballet, 1985.
- Basil, Don Quixote, Royal Ballet of Flanders, 1988.
- Title role, Cyrano de Bergerac, Bolshoi Ballet, 1988.
- Prince, The Sleeping Beauty, Paris Opera, 1989.
- Title role, Petrushka, Nijinsky Festival, Bolshoi Ballet, 1990.
- Solor, La Bayadere, Royal Ballet, London, 1990.
- Principal dancer, Farewell (pas de deux, later incorporated into Winter Dreams), Royal Ballet, London, 1990.
- Prince, The Nutcracker, Royal Ballet, London, 1990.
- Vershinin, Winter Dreams, Royal Ballet, Metropolitan Opera House, New York City, 1991.
- Des Grieux, Manon, Royal Ballet, London, 1991.
- Lescaut, Manon, Royal Ballet, London, 1991.
- Jean de Brienne, Raymonda, Royal Ballet, London, 1991.
- Title role, Cyrano de Bergerac, Royal Ballet, London, 1991.
- Chanson Dansee (an "Athlete"), Les Biches, Royal Ballet, London, 1991.
- Romeo, Romeo and Juliet, Royal Ballet, London, 1992.
- Title role, Othello, Sadler's Wells Theatre, London, 1994.

== Television appearances ==
- The Kennedy Center Honors: A Celebration of the Performing Arts, CBS, 1987.
- "The Nutcracker" The Bolshoi at The Bolshoi NHK production 1989
- The Hans Christian Andersen Awards 1988, PBS, 1990.
- Solor, "La Bayadere from the Royal Ballet," Great Performances, PBS, 1991. Dancing, PBS, 1993.
- Omnibus documentary, 1991.
- The South Bank Show, 2002.

== See also ==
- List of Russian ballet dancers
