= Ekaterina Krysanova =

Russian principal dancer of Bolshoi Ballet

- Born: Ekaterina Valerievna Krysanova; 22 March 1985 (age 40); Moscow, USSR
- Occupation: Ballet dancer
- Employer: Bolshoi Theatre

Ekaterina Valerievna Krysanova (Russian: Екатерина Валерьевна Крысанова) is a Russian principal dancer of Bolshoi Ballet.

== Biography ==
Krysanova was born in Moscow, Russia in 1985. Her mother took her to ballet lessons when she was 8. She began studying ballet at the Galina Vishnevskaya Opera Singing Center (Moscow) in 1995, then continued her studies at the Moscow State Choreographic School. L.M. Lavrovsky (teachers Galina Krapivina, Nina Speranskaya), and in 2001 - at the Moscow State Academy of Choreography (class of Tatiana Galtseva). She received a gold medal in 2001 at the Prix de Luxembourg International Ballet Competition and the same year was awarded a bronze in the Junior Competition. In 2002 she was awarded another bronze in Saint Petersburg and the same year attended Bolshoi Ballet Academy from which she graduated in 2003. In the same year, she became a member of the Bolshoi Ballet. She was promoted to the rank of soloist in 2006, became a first soloist in 2008 and by 2009 had been promoted to Leading Soloist under the direction of Svetlana Adyrkhaeva, appearing with the Bavarian State Opera. On 3 December 2011, after a performance of The Bright Stream, Krysanova (who played the role of Zina) reached the rank of Principal. She had appeared in such works as In the Upper Room of Twyla Tharp, Class Concert, Bolt by Alexei Ratmansky, Cinque, Russian Seasons, Ondine and many other contemporary works. Her first soloist role was as the Spanish Doll in The Nutcracker and was followed by the Fairy of Audacity in Sleeping Beauty, as well as many other memorable roles, most of which were produced by Yuri Grigorovich.

In 2017, Krysanova appeared in The Taming of the Shrew at the David H. Koch Theater and in 2018 she performed in Don Quixote.

== Awards ==
From the list on the Bolshoi Theater's website:

- 2001: 1st prize, Prix de Luxembourg International Ballet Competition
- 2001: 3rd prize, International Ballet Competition in Moscow (Junior group, Soloists category)
- 2002: 3rd prize, Vaganova-Prix International Ballet Competition "Ваганова-prix" (Saint-Petersburg)
- 2005: 2nd prize, International Ballet Competition in Moscow
- 2008: Soul of Dance prize (Rising Star category), Ballet Magazine
- 2013: People's Artist of the Republic of North Ossetia-Alania
- 2015: The Golden Mask National Theatre prize (Best ballet female part category) (Katarina in The Taming of the Shrew)
- 2015: Positano Léonide Massine Prize (Dancer of the Year on the International Stage nomination)
- 2016: Twined Prize Benois-Massine Moscow-Positano
- 2018: "Best Duet", international ballet festival Dance Open, with Igor Tsvirko
- 2018: Honored Artist of the Russian Federation
- 2024: People's Artist of the Russian Federation
