= Bolshoi Ballet =

Ballet company based at the Bolshoi Theatre in Russia

General information
- Name: Bolshoi Ballet
- Local name: Большой Театр; Балетная труппа Большого театра Baletnaya truppa Bol'shovo teatra
- Year founded: 1776; 250 years ago
- Principal venue: Bolshoi Theatre
- Website: http://www.bolshoi.ru

Senior staff
- Director: Vladimir Urin
- Ballet Director: Makhar Vaziev

Artistic staff
- Deputy director: Galina Stepanenko
- Music director: Tugan Sokhiev
- Resident choreographers: Yuri Grigorovich
- Ballet Master: Yuri Grigorovich

Other
- Parent company: Bolshoi Theatre
- Orchestra: Orchestra of the Bolshoi Theatre
- Official school: Moscow State Academy of Choreography
- Formation: Principal; Lead soloist First soloist Soloist; Corps de ballet

The Bolshoi Ballet is an internationally renowned classical ballet company based at the Bolshoi Theatre in Moscow, Russia. Founded in 1776, the Bolshoi is among the world's oldest ballet companies. In the early 20th century, it came to international prominence as Moscow became the capital of Soviet Russia. The Bolshoi has been recognised as one of the foremost ballet companies in the world. It has a branch at the Bolshoi Ballet Theater School in Joinville, Brazil.

== History ==
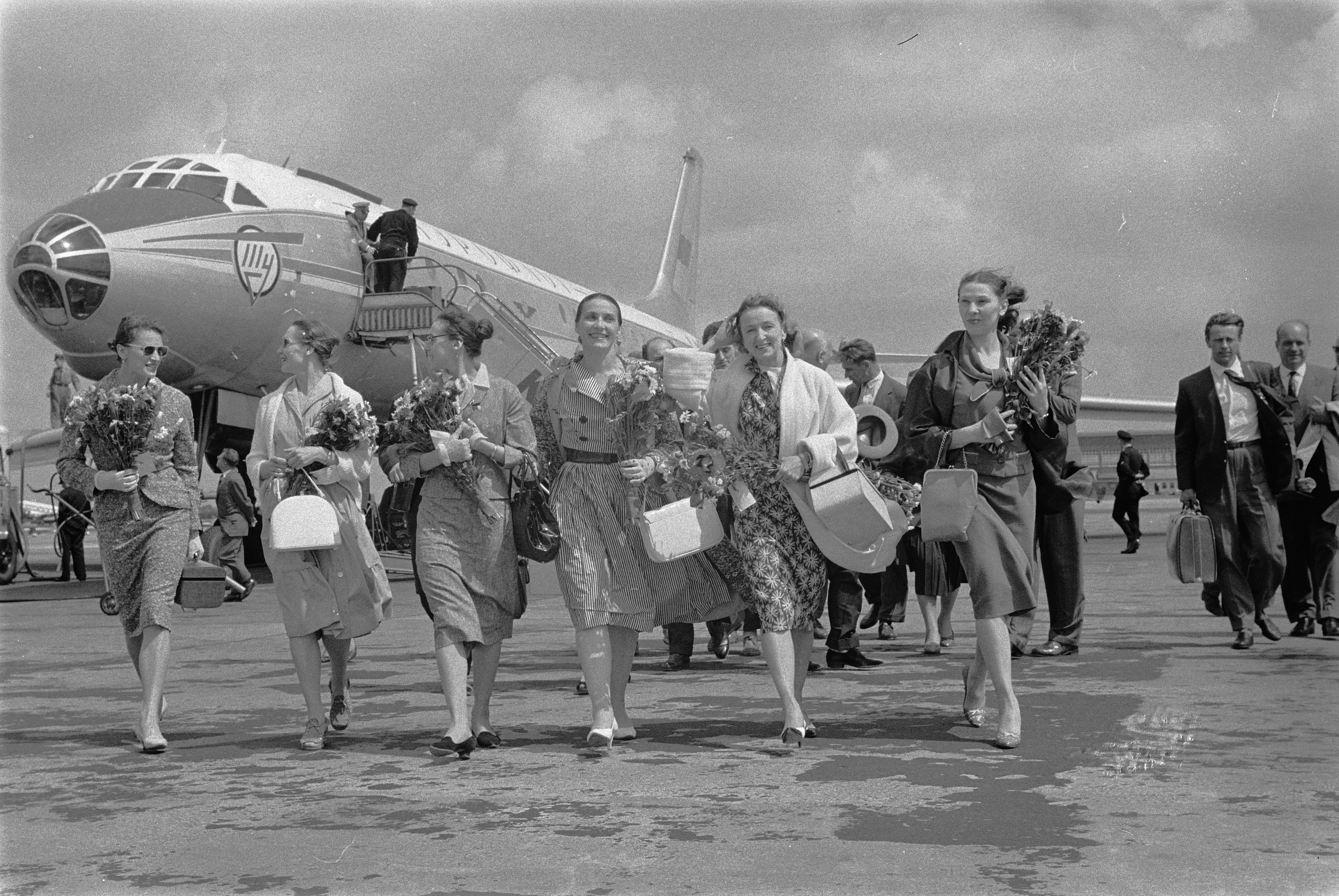
Soloists of the Bolshoi Ballet at the Schiphol airport, 9 June 1960

The earliest iteration of the Bolshoi Ballet can be found in the creation of a dance school for a Moscow orphanage in 1773. In 1776, dancers from the school were employed by Prince Pyotr Vasilyevich Urusov and English theatrical entrepreneur Michael Maddox to form part of their new theatre company. Originally performing in privately owned venues, they later acquired the Petrovsky Theatre, which, as a result of fires and erratic redevelopment, would later be rebuilt as today's Bolshoi Theatre. While some guest dancers come and go from other prestigious ballet companies, such as Mariinsky and American Ballet Theatre, most company dancers are graduates of the academy. In 1989, Michael Shannon was the first American ballet dancer to graduate from the Bolshoi Ballet Academy and join the Bolshoi Ballet company.

Despite staging many famous ballets, it struggled to compete with the reputation of the Imperial Russian Ballet, today's Mariinsky Ballet of St. Petersburg. It was not until the appointment of Alexander Gorsky as Ballet Master in 1900 that the company began to develop its own unique identity, with acclaimed productions of new or restaged ballets including Don Quixote (1900), Coppélia (1901), Swan Lake (1901), La fille mal gardée (1903), Giselle (1911), Le Corsaire (1912) and La Bayadère (1917).

The Soviet leadership's preference for uncomplicated moral themes in the arts was demonstrated in Yuri Grigorovich's appointment as director in 1964. Grigorovich held his position until 1995, at which point a series of directors, including Boris Akimov, Alexei Ratmansky, Yuri Burlaka and Sergei Filin, brought more modern dance performance ideas to the company.

== Repertoire ==
- A Hero of Our Time, Yuri Possokhov
- A Legend of Love, Yuri Grigorovich
- Anna Karenina, John Neumeier
- Anyuta, Vladimir Vasiliev
- Apollo, George Balanchine
- Carmen Suite, Alberto Alonso
- Coppélia, Marius Petipa and Enrico Cecchetti; Revived by Sergei Vikharev
- Don Quixote, Marius Petipa and Alexander Gorsky; Revived by Alexei Fadeyechev
- Études, Harald Lander
- Forgotten Land, Jiří Kylián
- Frank Bridge Variations, Hans van Manen
- Giselle, Jean Coralli and Jules Perrot; Version of Yuri Grigorovich
- Ivan the Terrible, Yuri Grigorovich
- Jewels, George Balanchine
- La Bayadere, Marius Petipa; Version of Yuri Grigorovich
- La Fille du pharaon, Pierre Lacotte
- La Fille mal gardée, Alexander Gorsky; Version of Yuri Grigorovich
- La Sylphide, August Bournonville; Version of Johan Kobborg
- Lady of the Camellias (La Dame aux camelias), John Neumeier
- Le Corsaire, Marius Petipa; Version of Alexei Ratmansky and Yuri Burlaka
- Nureyev
- The Nutcracker, Yuri Grigorovich
- Ondine, Vyacheslav Samodurov
- Onegin, John Cranko
- Raymonda, Marius Petipa; Version of Yuri Grigorovich
- Romeo and Juliet, Yuri Grigorovich
- Romeo and Juliet, Alexei Ratmansky
- Russian Seasons, Alexei Ratmansky
- Short Time Together, Paul Lightfoot and Sol Leon
- Spartacus, Yuri Grigorovich
- Swan Lake, Marius Petipa; Version of Yuri Grigorovich
- Symphony of Psalms, Jiri Kylian
- The Bright Stream, Alexei Ratmansky
- The Cage, Jerome Robbins
- The Flames of Paris, Vasily Vainonen, Version of Alexei Ratmansky
- The Golden Age, Yuri Grigorovich
- The Sleeping Beauty, Marius Petipa; Version of Yuri Grigorovich
- Taming of the Shrew, Jean-Christophe Maillot

== Notable staff ==
=== Dancers ===
- Galina Ulanova
- Marina Semyonova
- Olga Lepeshinskaya
- Mikhail Mordkin
- Vasily Tikhomirov
- Yekaterina Geltzer
- Asaf Messerer
- Maya Plisetskaya
- Pyotr Gusev
- Aleksey Yermolayev
- Nikolai Fadeyechev
- Maris Liepa
- Ekaterina Maximova
- Vladimir Vasiliev
- Natalia Bessmertnova
- Ludmila Semenyaka
- Nadezhda Pavlova
- Joy Womack
- Svetlana Adyrkhaeva
- Marina Kondratyeva
- Nina Timofeeva
- Nina Semizorova
- Irek Mukhamedov
- Alexander Godunov
- Alla Mikhalchenko
- Nina Ananiashvili
- Dmitry Belogolovtsev
- Natalia Osipova
- Svetlana Lunkina
- Dmitry Gudanov
- Anna Antonicheva
- Nikolay Tsiskaridze
- Maria Allash
- Nina Kaptsova

=== Directors ===
- Alexander Gorsky
- Vasily Tikhomirov
- Vladimir Urin

=== Conductors ===
- Andrei Anikhanov
- Yuri Fayer
- Algis Shuraitis

=== Choreographers ===
- Rostislav Zakharov
- Leonid Lavrovsky
- Fyodor Lopukhov
- Yury Grigorovich

=== Composers ===
- Dimitri Shostakovich
- Aram Khachaturian

== Company structure ==
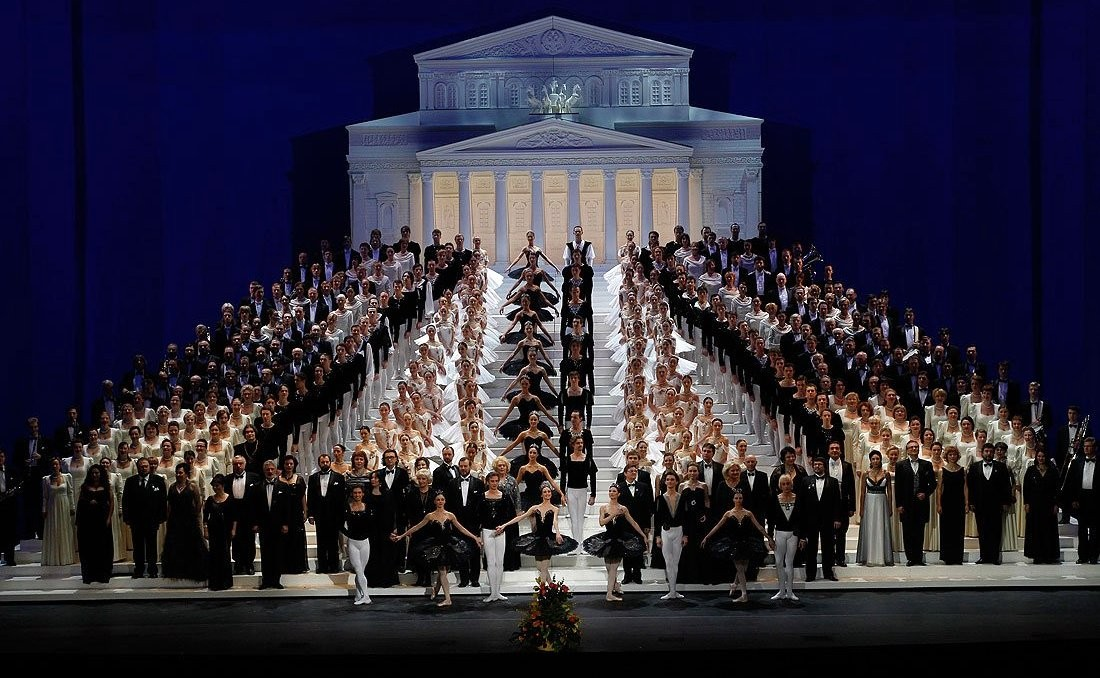
Bolshoi Ballet troupe after the reopening gala of the Bolshoi Theatre in 2011

Today the Bolshoi Ballet remains one of the world's foremost ballet companies, in addition to being one of the largest, with approximately 220 dancers. The word "bolshoi" means "big" or "grand" in Russian. The company operates on a hierarchical system, similar to those used by other leading European ballet companies, with senior dancers ranked as principals, and descending in order of importance through lead soloist, first soloist, soloist and finally, corps de ballet. Due to its size, the company operates two troupes of corps de ballet.

In 2000, the Bolshoi Ballet opened its first Ballet Academy outside Russia, in Joinville, Brazil.

== Performance style ==
The performance style of the Bolshoi Ballet is typically identified as being colourful and bold, combining technique and athleticism with expressiveness and dramatic intensity. This style is commonly attributed to Alexander Gorsky. Historically there has been a fierce rivalry with the St. Petersburg Heritage Ballet Company, the Mariinsky. Both have developed very different performing styles: the Bolshoi has a more colourful and bold approach, whereas the Mariinsky is associated with more pure and refined classicism.

== Dancers ==
=== Principal dancers ===
Female

- Elizaveta Kokoreva
- Alena Kovaleva
- Kristina Kretova
- Ekaterina Krysanova
- Anna Nikulina
- Evgenia Obraztsova
- Eleonora Sevenard
- Yekaterina Shipulina (working under contract)
- Anastasia Stashkevich
- Yulia Stepanova
- Svetlana Zakharova

Male

- Artemy Belyakov
- Semyon Chudin
- Egor Gerashchenko
- Vladislav Lantratov
- Mikhail Lobukhin
- Vyacheslav Lopatin
- Artem Ovcharenko
- Denis Rodkin
- Denis Savin
- Ruslan Skvortsov (working under contract)
- Dmitry Smilevsky
- Igor Tsvirko

=== Leading soloists ===
Female

- Arina Denisova
- Olga Marchenkova
- Eva Sergeyenkova
- Margarita Shrayner
- Maria Vinogradova

Male

- Mark Chino
- Dmitry Vyskubenko

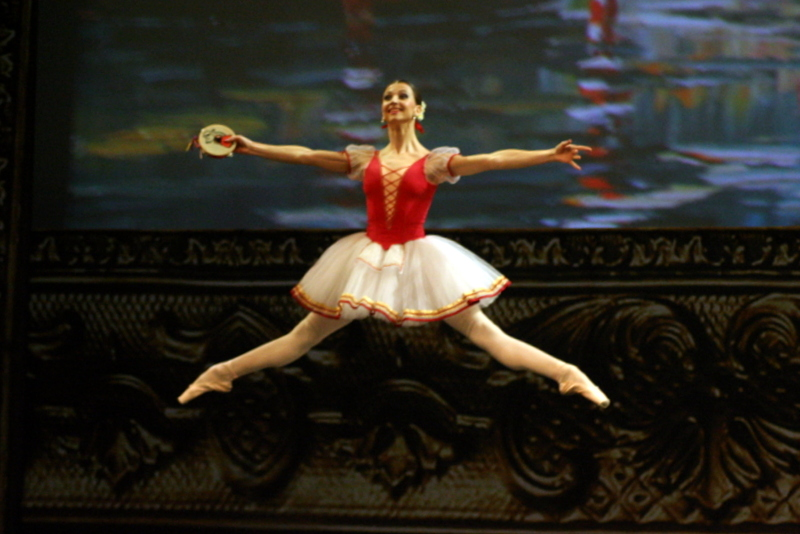
Anna Tikhomirova performing in Delhi

=== First soloists ===
Female

- Daria Khokhlova
- Maria Koshkaryova
- Elizaveta Kruteleva
- Anastasia Meskova
- Anna Tikhomirova

Male

- Klim Efimov
- Daniil Potaptsev
- Alexei Putintsev
- Alexander Vodopetov
- Gennadi Yanin (working under contract)
- Denis Zakharov

=== Soloists ===
Female

- Anastasia Chapkina
- Anastasia Denisova
- Nelli Kobakhidze
- Yaroslavna Kuprina
- Sofia Maymula
- Maria Mishina
- Uliyana Moksheva
- Kristina Petrova
- Stanislava Postnova
- Maria Shuvalova
- Anastasia Smirnova
- Alexandra Trikoz
- Ana Turazashvili
- Ekaterina Varlamova
- Anastasia Vinokur
- Angelina Vlashinets
- Ksenia Zhiganshina

Male

- Alexander Fadeyechev (working under contract)
- Georgy Gusev
- Egor Khromushin (working under contract)
- Alexei Loparevich (working under contract)
- Makar Mikhalkin
- Anton Savichev (working under contract)
- Andrei Sitnikov (working under contract)
- Alexander Smoliyaninov
- Ivan Sorokin

=== Corps de ballet ===
The Bolshoi Ballet operates two troupes of corps de ballet, with approximately 169 dancers in total.

== Controversies ==
In 2013, ballerina Anastasia Volochkova claimed that female dancers were forced to sleep with wealthy patrons, saying: "It mainly happened with the corps du [sic] ballet but also with the soloists. [...] I repeatedly received such propositions to share the beds of oligarchs." American dancer Joy Womack echoed this concern when she left the company after being told that, to secure solo roles, she must either pay $10,000 or "start a relationship with a sponsor."

In January 2013, a sulfuric acid attack on art director Sergei Filin once again steeped the company in scandal. Bolshoi dancer Pavel Dmitrichenko was convicted of organizing the attack and was sentenced to six years in prison. Reasons for the attack include corruption within the company.

In 2014, 25-year-old ballet dancer Olga Demina mysteriously went missing. In September 2020, Russian investigators announced that they believe Demina may have been killed in a blackmail plot by Malkhaz Dzhavoev, whom she was dating and was allegedly her "manager".

In July 2017, the Bolshoi Theatre cancelled the premiere of a ballet about openly gay Soviet dancer Rudolf Nureyev. The Director General claimed that it was due to poor dancing quality; however, principal dancer Maria Alexandrova claimed it was the first sign of a 'new era' of censorship. It was the first time a show has been pulled in such a way since the collapse of the Soviet Union, sparking rumours about the motivation behind the move.

In 2022, the Bolshoi Ballet, like the Mariinsky Ballet, removed the name of choreographer Alexei Ratmansky from his ballets, owing to his opposition to Russia's full-scale invasion of Ukraine. However, it continued to perform the ballets without Ratmansky's permission. He stated that he intended to sue the company.

In the spring of 2025, allegations emerged that critics were offered bribes to write positive reviews about the debut of Maria Shuvalova, daughter of former first deputy prime minister Igor Shuvalov, in the title role in Anyuta. Despite the controversy surrounding the quality of her performances, Shuvalova was promoted to the rank of soloist in July 2025.

== See also ==
- List of productions of Swan Lake derived from its 1895 revival
- Moscow State Academy of Choreography, affiliate school
- Mariinsky Ballet
