= The Limpid Stream =

1935 ballet by Dmitri Shostakovich

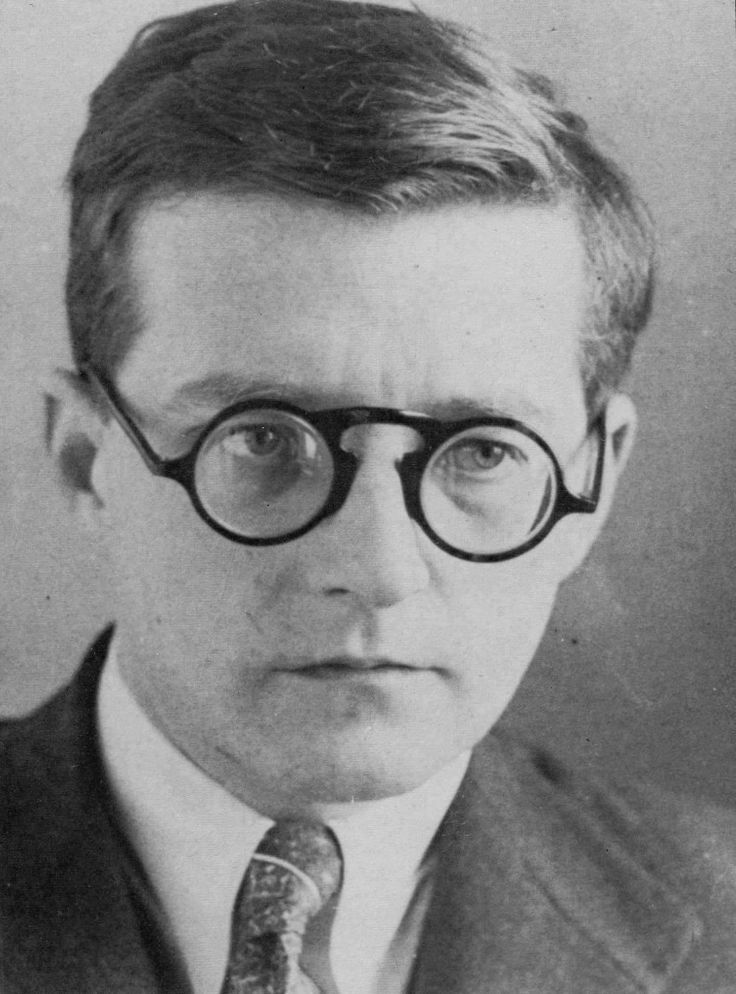
Dmitri Shostakovich before 1941

The Limpid Stream (Russian: Светлый ручей, also translated as The Bright Stream), Op. 39, is a ballet in 3 acts, 4 scenes, composed by Dmitri Shostakovich on the libretto by Adrian Piotrovsky and Fyodor Lopukhov, with choreography by Fyodor Lopukhov. It premiered in Leningrad's Mikhaylovsky Theatre in 1935.

== Plot ==
The plot centres around a group of ballet dancers who have been sent to provide sophisticated entertainment on a new Soviet collective farm during their harvest festival. The workers, along with two older residents of a nearby dacha, welcome the city dancers, with special welcome given to the troupe's ballerina who was the former dance teacher of Zina. Zina introduces the ballerina to her husband, Pyotr, and Pyotr immediately begins to flirt with the ballerina. Hurt, Zina removes herself from the celebrations and is comforted by the ballerina. The ballerina suggests a plan in which she will dress as her dance partner, her dance partner will dress as a female dancer, and Zina will dress as the ballerina. They will fool Pyotr and the two dacha dwellers and Pyotr will realize his mistake. The woes of two other couples with overly-assured men are also resolved through the plan. After this all has been accomplished, there is a grand celebration which, in the Ratmansky production, includes the grim reaper who, after a scare, is banished.

== Score and instrumentation ==
The score includes references to Tchaikovsky and other ballet composers.

Woodwinds: piccolo, 2 flutes (flute 2 doubles on 2nd piccolo), 2 oboes, cor anglais (English horn), E♭ clarinet, 2 B♭ clarinets, bass clarinet (doubling on B-flat clarinet 3 ), 2 bassoons, contrabassoon (doubling on bassoon 3)

Brass: 6 French horns, 3 trumpets, 3 trombones, bass tuba, onstage brass band (E♭ cornet, 2 B♭ cornets, 2 B♭ trumpets, 2 E♭ alto horns, 2 B♭ tenor horns, 2 B♭ baritone horns, 2 B♭ bass horns)

Percussion: 4 timpani drums, triangle, tambourine, 2 snare drums, 1 pair of crash cymbals, suspended cymbal, glockenspiel, xylophone, bass drum, gong, 2 wood blocks, celesta

Strings: 16 1st violins, 14 2nd violins, 12 violas, 10 cellos, 8 double basses, harp

=== Suite ===
In 1945, Shostakovich approved Konstantin Titarenko to make a suite from the ballet. It was designated Op. 39a and comprises five movements:

1. Waltz
2. Russian Popular Dance
3. Galop
4. Adagio
5. Pizzicato: Allegretto

== Reception ==
The other two ballet scores written by Shostakovich are The Golden Age, from 1930, and The Bolt, from 1931. "All three were banned shortly after their premieres, leaving Shostakovich's reputation so damaged that he was reluctant ever to write for the lyric stage again." The Bright Stream's deliberately simple melodies, harmonies, rhythms, and colors had the work playing successfully in both Leningrad and Moscow from June 1935 through February 1936. An editorial entitled "Balletic Falsity" in Pravda in early February 1936 condemned the ballet, which was subsequently withdrawn. Due to this, one of the librettists, Piotrovsky was arrested in November the following year and executed in a gulag. Lopukhov, as choreographer and co-librettist, likely escaped from a similar fate due to his connections through his sister Lydia Lopokova.

== Productions ==
Alexei Ratmansky, currently an artist in residence at New York City Ballet and the former director of the Bolshoi Ballet, first came across the full score of the ballet in a recording made by Gennady Rozhdestvensky in Stockholm in 1995. Unable to restore the original choreography of the ballet, which was never notated, Ratmansky wrote his own choreography and staged the new two act version of The Limpid Stream with the Bolshoi Ballet in Moscow in 2003.

In July 2005 the Bolshoi performed The Bright Stream at the Met, and in August 2006, at the Royal Opera House, London. The Bolshoi performed it in Moscow during late October 2017, as well as in London during August 2019.

In January 2011, American Ballet Theatre performed The Bright Stream in Ratmansky's choreography, at the Kennedy Center, Washington, D.C.
