= The Pharaoh's Daughter =

1862 ballet by Marius Petipa

The Pharaoh's Daughter (Russian: Дочь фараона, romanized: Doch faraona; French: La Fille du pharaon) is a ballet choreographed by Marius Petipa to music by Cesare Pugni. The libretto was a collaboration between Jules-Henri Vernoy de Saint-Georges and Petipa from Théophile Gautier's Le Roman de la momie. It was first presented by the Imperial Ballet at the Imperial Bolshoi Kamenny Theatre, in St. Petersburg, Russia, on 18 January (N.S. 30 January) 1862, with the design by A. Roller, G. Wagner (scenery), Kelwer and Stolyakov (costumes).

The principal dancers at the opening night were Carolina Rosati (Mummy/Aspicia), Nicholas Goltz (Pharaoh), Marius Petipa (Ta-Hor), Timofey Stoukolkin as John Bull, Lubov Radina (Ramzaya), Felix Kschessinskiy (King of Nubia), and Lev Ivanov (Fisherman). For Petipa it was the last role: after it he finished his career as a dancer and became ballet master.

The Sergeyev Collection, which is part of the Harvard University Theatre Collection, contains choreographic notations of the Imperial Ballet's production of The Pharaoh's Daughter, created circa 1905. The notations document the choreography and mise-en-scène as staged by Marius Petipa for his last revival of 1898, which was mounted especially for the benefit performance of Mathilde Kschessinskaya.

== Plot ==
An English lord and John Bull, his servant, and a guide shelter from a sandstorm in a pyramid during an African safari. They start to become noisy, but the guide asks them to quiet down in respect for the Pharaoh's daughter who is lying in a coffin somewhere in the pyramid. So, to pass the time, the guide gives out opium. As soon as the nobleman puffs the opium, weird things start to happen. The many other mummies in the pyramid start to come alive. Suddenly the Pharaoh's daughter, Aspicia, comes alive and lays her hand over the nobleman's heart, and the nobleman is transported into the past. He becomes Ta-Hor, an ancient Egyptian man who saves Aspicia from a lion. Ta-Hor and Aspicia fall in love, but she is betrothed to the Nubian king. They run away together and the king chases them. Ta-Hor and Aspicia stop in a fishermen's inn to hide out, and the local fishermen ask them if they want to come on a fishing trip. Aspicia decides to stay behind. Then the Nubian king stops at the inn to rest and finds Aspicia who jumps into the Nile River to escape his guards.

At the bottom of the river, the Spirit of the Nile summons the great rivers of the world to dance for Aspicia, then he tells her that she must stay. When she hears this, she asks for one wish: to bring her back to land. When the fishermen and Ta-Hor arrive back on land, the Nubian king detains Ta-Hor and brings him back to the Pharaoh's palace to be punished for "kidnapping" the princess.

When Aspicia comes back to land, the fishermen bring her back to the palace. She gets there in time to see Ta-Hor sentenced to death by a cobra bite. She explains that if he dies, she dies, and reaches out for the snake to bite her. The Pharaoh pulls her back and grants her permission to marry Ta-Hor, and the Nubian king leaves in a fit of rage, swearing revenge. Everyone starts to celebrate, but as the party reaches its peak, the opium dream ends and Ta-Hor is transformed back into the English lord. As they leave the pyramid, the nobleman looks back at Aspicia's coffin and remembers the love that they shared and still share.

== History ==
The Pharaoh's Daughter (La Fille du pharaon) was the first multi-act grand ballet Marius Petipa staged during his long career with the St. Petersburg Imperial Theatres. The ballet was staged especially for the benefit performance of the Italian ballerina Carolina Rosati, who performed the principal role of the Princess Aspicia. She danced opposite Marius Petipa, who portrayed Aspicia's hero and lover, Lord Wilson/Ta-Hor. The premiere on 30 January [O.S. 18 January] 1862 was an enormous success, and soon the ballet became the most popular work in the repertoire of the Imperial Ballet.

Marius Petipa staged The Pharaoh's Daughter while he was still serving as assistant ballet master to Arthur Saint-Léon, who from 1859 until 1869 served as Premier Maître de Ballet to the St. Petersburg Imperial Theatres. The success of The Pharaoh's Daughter earned for Petipa the position of second Maître de Ballet, a position he would hold until Saint-Léon's departure from Russia in 1869.

Petipa revived The Pharaoh's Daughter in 1885 and again in 1898. In 1905, Alexander Gorsky put on a modified production for the Imperial Bolshoi Ballet without Petipa's approval, and the ballet continued to be performed until 1928. In 2000, it was revived in Pierre Lacotte's restaging for the Bolshoi Ballet, which Lacotte based partly on the Stepanov notation recording Petipa's final production and partly on the personal recollections of Russian dancers. It has since become a regular part of the Bolshoi's repertory.

In 2023, the Mariinsky Theatre premiered a historical reconstruction based on the original Stepanov notation preserved in the Sergeyev Collection. The staging was carried out by choreographer Toni Candeloro, with set and costume designs created by Robert Perdizola. Candeloro’s work was informed by his research with dancers trained by Lubov Egorova, Olga Preobrajenskaya and Mathilde Kschessinska. He is regarded as a specialist in preserving the traditions of the late Imperial Theatre and the Ballets Russes, drawing on more than four decades of professional experience.

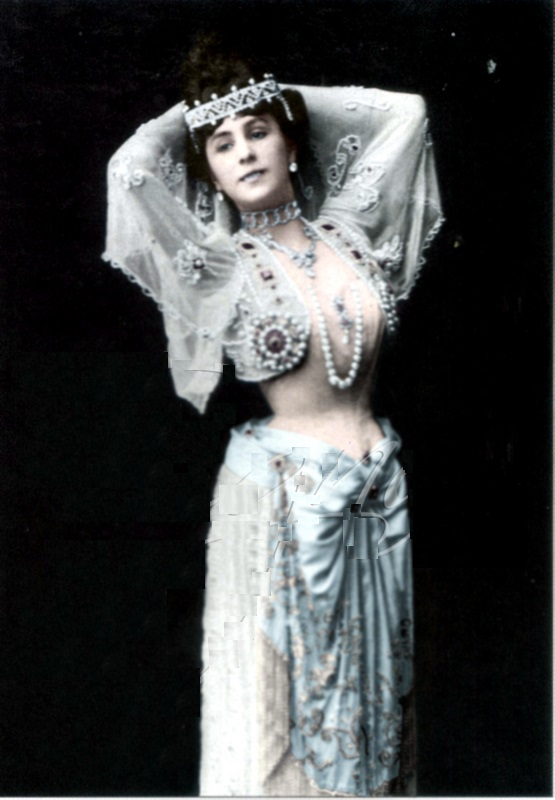
Mathilde Kschessinskaya as the Princess Aspicia (1903)

It was also a production of the choreographic trend parallel to that of the grand opera in music, towards the ballet à grand spectacle, which lasted four hours and used different styles and techniques and a large number of people (about 400), with plots characterized by strong dramatic contrasts.

Marius Petipa changed the art of classical ballet by inserting divertissements, or displays of dance that were perhaps symbolic or loose importance to the story, as a display for dancers that were not the leads. This was important because, at the time, many foreign guest artists were being brought in and the Russian-trained, Russian-dancers were not being given the chance to display their own talents. Marius Petipa started putting these divertissements in all of his ballets (Swan Lake, La Bayadère, The Sleeping Beauty, etc.) and the divertissement itself became a technique used by many choreographers as a way to give dancers time to change costumes, shoes, or create a scene break.

The interest in Ancient Egypt at the time, inspired by recent archaeological finds, as well as Gautier's Le Roman de la momie, gave Petipa the push to create The Pharaoh's Daughter. These interests and finds inspired a new wave of costuming, such as the newly shortened tutu being decorated with Egyptian jewelry and ornamentation. These decorations were meant to give the audience a better feel to the ballet and reflect Egyptian nationality. Some of these costumes could be considered racist, as the leads were dressed in beautiful, expensive costumes, where the Nationalistic dances could be covered in blackface. They were meant to inspire a feeling of Egyptian taste, but authenticity was often compromised for opulence and could be considered entirely offensive.

The ballet's literary source is Le Roman de la momie by Théophile Gautier, an exponent of literary exoticism which offered all sorts of romantic expedients: the passionate love story of the great Pharaoh's daughter and Tahoser set in a Biblical Egypt which, however, disappeared in the ballet, and the Gothic taste for gloomy corridors and dark tombs. What the ballet retains of Gautier's world is the sense of the fantastic which accompanies earthly passions. With an artifact from the past or a puff of opium – a familiar influence in the works and lives of contemporary artists such as De Quincey – allowed Gautier to add a brighter aura to his characters by setting them on the borderline between life and death from which all Egyptian art took nourishment.

So as not to overwhelm his readers with terror, Gautier frequently appeals to irony, which has an anticlimactic effect. Irony serves the same function in the ballet, for example in the moment when Lord Wilson, the quintessence of Englishness, impassively attempts to sketch the scene of the desert disturbed by the simoom, or when Aspicia, after rising from the sarcophagus, looks into a mirror and is pleased to find herself as pretty as she was a few millennia before.

The story called for an artist in the title role who had a special dramatic talent (as did Rosati), because of all the scenes of love, fear, and courage which culminate in Aspicia's attempt to cast herself onto a flower-basket hiding a snake, a classic gesture since Cleopatra's time. Twenty years later, Virginia Zucchi (less conventionally) portrayed an unusually humane princess, not as arrogant and voluptuous as that of her successor Mathilde Kschessinskaya who, on the other hand, made it more of a virtuoso role.

Petipa's penchant for folklore enhanced the dance of bayadères and the pageant of the rivers (from Guadalquivir to Neva), all dressed up in national costumes, but historical inaccuracy and the mixing of styles raised a few criticisms, especially in Moscow, in spite of the general taste for sets and costumes reinvented with a minimum of realism and a maximum of grandeur.

== Photographs of The Pharaoh's Daughter ==
Vera Karalli as the Princess Aspicia and Platon Karsavin as Father Nile with unidentified children in the scene The Kingdom of the Rivers. St. Petersburg, circa 1915

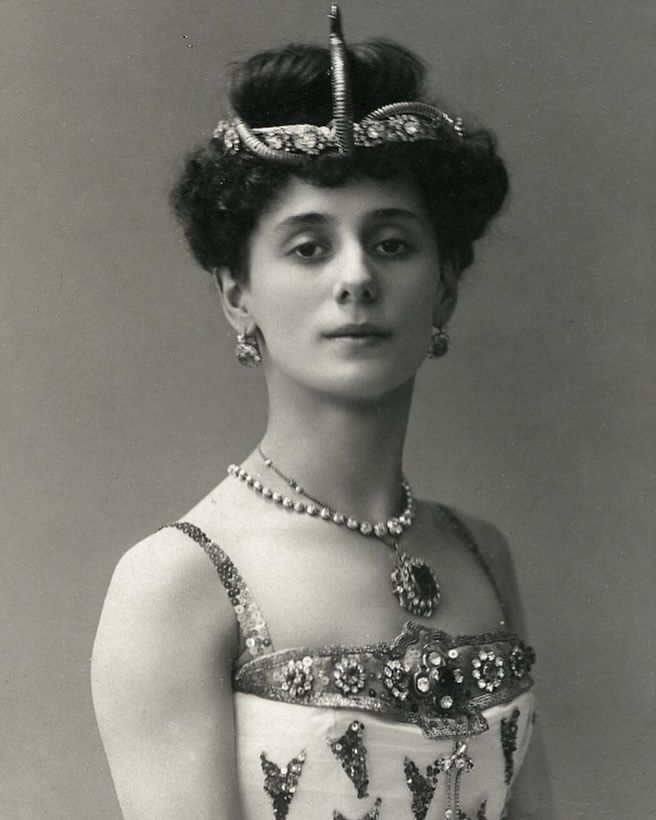
Photographic postcard of Anna Pavlova as the Princess Aspicia in Petipa's 1898 production, circa 1910

Anna Pavlova as the Princess Aspicia and Mikhail Mordkin as Lord Wilson/Taor in Alexander Gorsky's 1905 revision for the Moscow Bolshoi Theatre, 1909

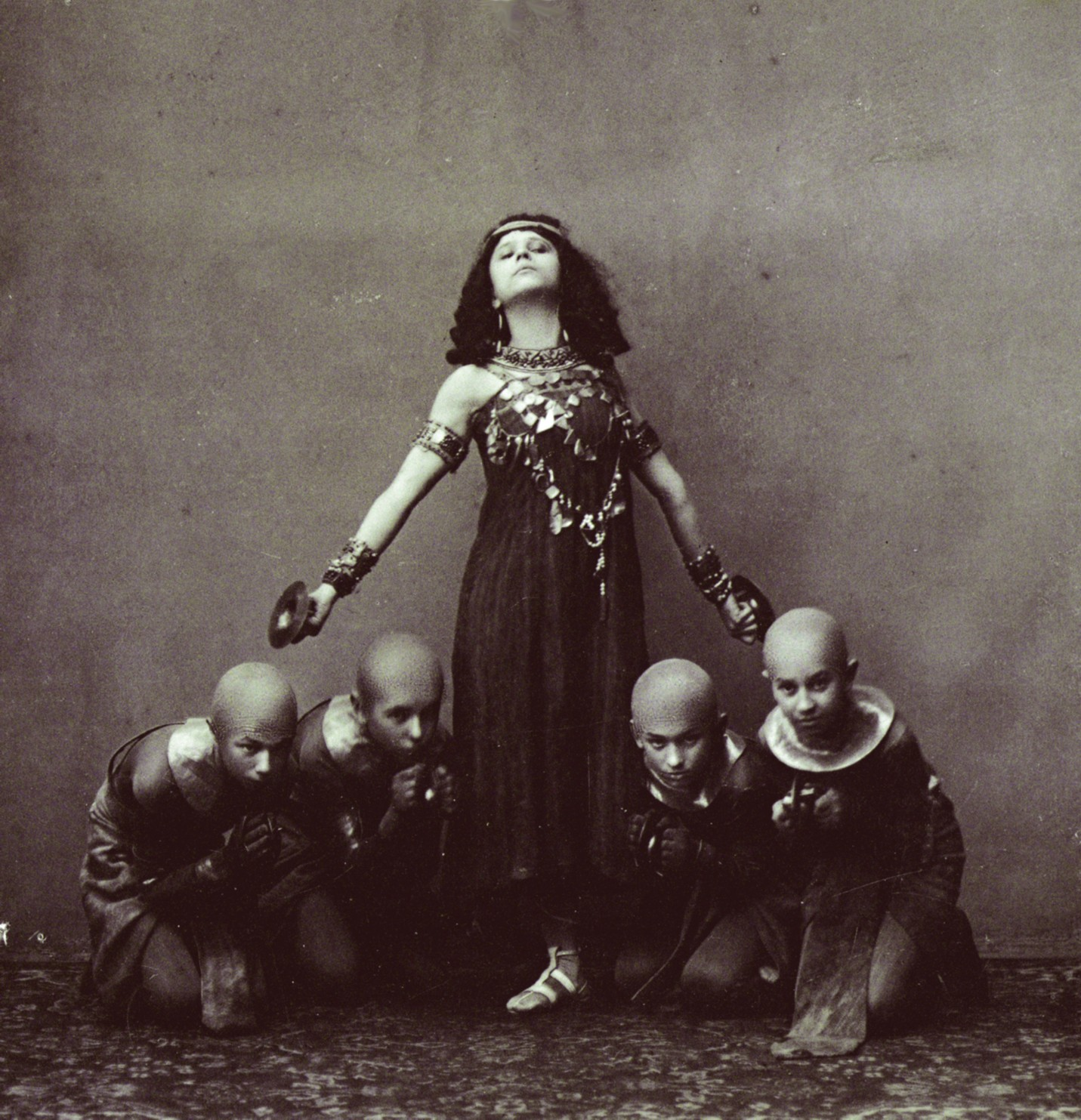
Sofia Fedorova as the slave Hita (or Ramzé) with unidentified children in the Pas des Caryatids from Alexander Gorsky's 1905 revision for the Moscow Bolshoi Theatre, 1909

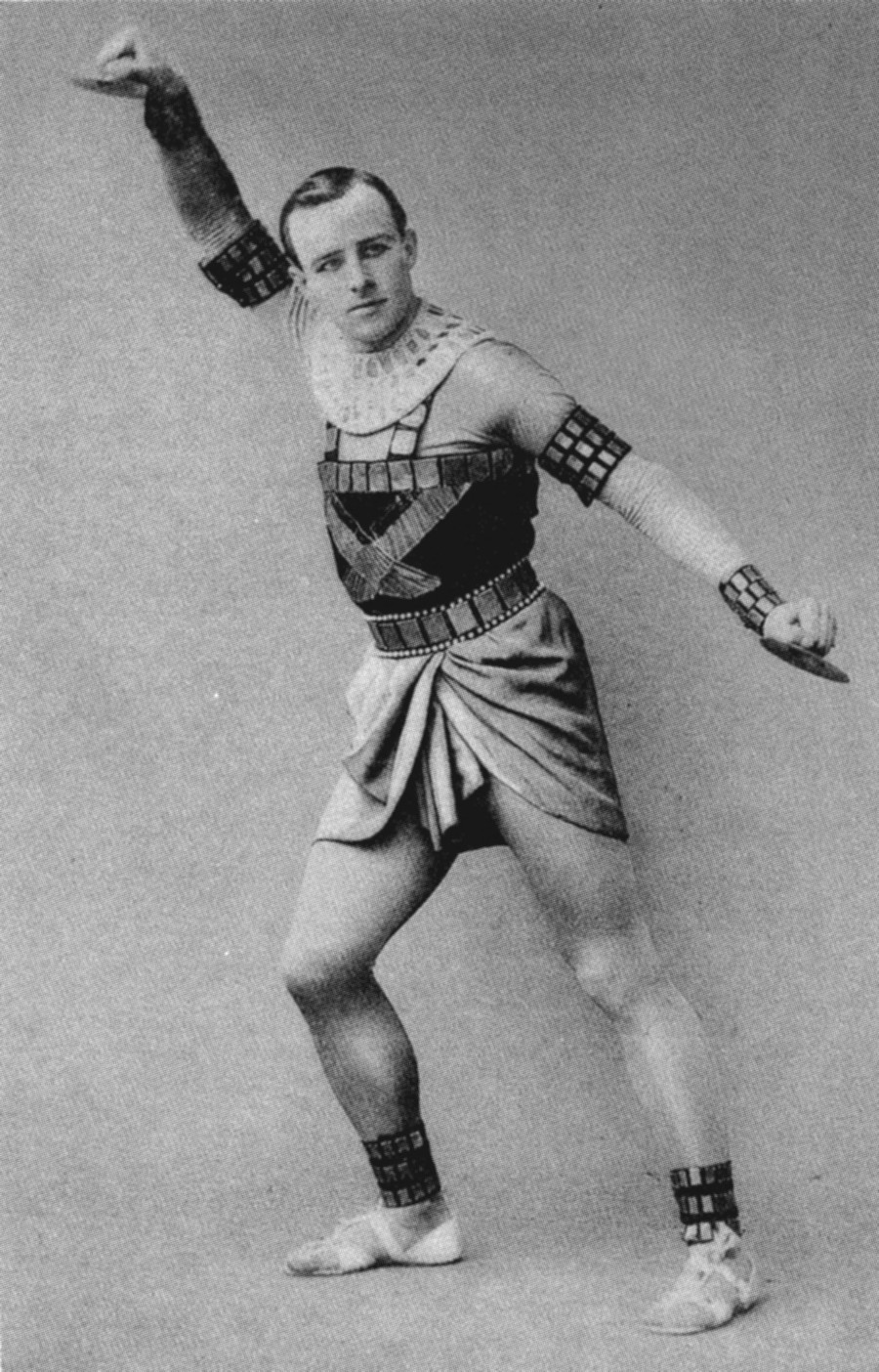
Mikhail Mordkin as Taor in Alexander Gorsky's 1905 revision for the Moscow Bolshoi Theatre, 1909

== Sources ==
- Anderson, J. 1992. "Ballet & Modern Dance: A Concise History", 2nd edition. New Jersey: Princeton Book Company.
- Bremster, M. 1993. "International Dictionary of Ballet" Detroit: St James Press.
