= The Golden Age (Shostakovich) =

1930 ballet by Dmitri Shostakovich

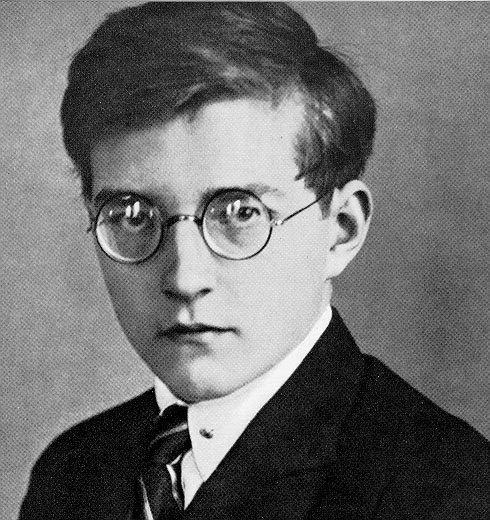
Dmitri Shostakovich in 1925

The Golden Age or The Age of Gold (Russian: Золотой век, Zolotoi vek), Op. 22, is a ballet in three acts and six scenes by Dmitri Shostakovich to a libretto by Alexander Ivanovsky. Choreographed by Vasili Vainonen (first act), Leonid Jacobson (second act), and V. Chesnakov (third act), it premiered on 26 October 1930 at the Kirov Theatre.

The work was performed eighteen times and was initially censored due to its inclusion of modern European dance styles.

== Plot summary ==
The ballet is a satirical take on the political and cultural change in 1920s Europe. It follows a Soviet football (soccer) team in a Western city where they come into contact with many politically incorrect antagonistic characters such as the Diva, the Fascist, the Agent Provocateur, the Negro and others. The team falls victim to match rigging, police harassment, and unjust imprisonment by the evil bourgeoisie. The team is freed from jail when the local workers overthrow their capitalist overlords. The ballet ends with a dance of solidarity between the workers and the football team.

Shostakovich himself was a very keen football follower, and is said to have coined the expression "Football is the ballet of the masses".

=== Sections ===
- Prelude
- Act I, Scene 1, The Golden Age of Industry Exhibition: Procession of the Guests of Honour
- Act I, Scene 1, The Golden Age of Industry Exhibition: Inspection of the Display Windows
- Act I, Scene 1, The Golden Age of Industry Exhibition: Demonstration of Important Exhibits - Appearance of the Soviet Football Team
- Act I, Scene 1, The Golden Age of Industry Exhibition: Magician-Advertising Agent - Dance of the Hindu
- Act I, Scene 1, The Golden Age of Industry Exhibition: Boxing as an Advertising Stunt
- Act I, Scene 1, The Golden Age of Industry Exhibition: Scandal during the Boxing Match - Entrance of the Police
- Act I, Scene 2, Exhibition Hall: Dance of the Golden Youths
- Act I, Scene 2, Exhibition Hall: Dance of Diva: Adagio
- Act I, Scene 2, Exhibition Hall: Appearance of the Soviet Football Team and Diva's Variations
- Act I, Scene 2, Exhibition Hall: Soviet Dance
- Act I, Scene 2, Exhibition Hall: Diva asks the Leader of the Soviet Team to Dance with Her
- Act I, Scene 2, Exhibition Hall: Dance and Scene of the Diva and the Fascist
- Act I, Scene 2, Exhibition Hall: Dance of the Black Man and 2 Soviet Football Players
- Act I, Scene 2, Exhibition Hall: The Supposed Terrorist, "The Hand of Moscow"
- Act I, Scene 2, Exhibition Hall: General Confusion - The Embarrassment of the Fascists
- Act I, Scene 2, Exhibition Hall: A Rare Case of Mass Hysteria
- Act I, Scene 2, Exhibition Hall: Conversation between the Director of the Exhibition and the Fascist
- Act I, Scene 2, Exhibition Hall: Foxtrot ... foxtrot ... foxtrot
- Act II, Scene 3, A Street in the Same City: Mime of the Agents Provocateurs, Provocation and Arrest: Galop
- Act II, Scene 4, Workers' Stadium: Procession of the Workers to the Stadium - Dance of the Young Pioneers - Sports Games
- Act II, Scene 4, Workers' Stadium: Football March
- Act II, Scene 4, Workers' Stadium: Intermezzo, "Everybody amuses oneself in one's own way"
- Act II, Scene 4, Workers' Stadium: Dance of the Western Komsomol Girl and 4 Sportsmen
- Act II, Scene 4, Workers' Stadium: Sports Contests - Joint Sports Dance
- Act II, Scene 4, Workers' Stadium: Scene and Exit of the Soviet Team
- Act III: Entr'acte, "Tea for Two"
- Act III, Scene 5, Music Hall: Chechotka, "Shoe Shine of the Highest Grade"
- Act III, Scene 5, Music Hall: Tango
- Act III, Scene 5, Music Hall: Polka, "Once upon a Time in Geneva" - Polka, "Angel of Peace"
- Act III, Scene 5, Music Hall: The Touching Coalition of the Classes, slightly fraudulent
- Act III, Scene 5, Music Hall: Entrance of Diva and the Fascist - Their Dance
- Act III, Scene 5, Music Hall: Can-can
- Act III, Scene 6, Prison Building: Prelude
- Act III, Scene 6, Prison Building: Scene of the Freeing of the Prisoners
- Act III, Scene 6, Prison Building: Total Unveiling of the Conspiracy - The Bourgeoisie in Panic
- Act III, Scene 6, Prison Building: Final Dance of Solidarity

== Instrumentation ==
- Woodwinds: two flutes (2nd doubling piccolo), two oboes (2nd doubling cor anglais [English horn]), three clarinets in B-flat (2nd doubling E♭ clarinet, 3rd doubling bass clarinet), two saxophones (alto and baritone, doubling on soprano and tenor saxophones), and two bassoons (2nd doubling contrabassoon)
- Brass: four French horns, three trumpets, three trombones, euphonium, and bass tuba
- Percussion: four timpani drums, triangle, woodblock, tambourine, flexatone, ratchet, snare drum, one pair of crash cymbals, suspended cymbal, splash cymbal, police whistle, bass drum, tam-tam (gong), xylophone, glockenspiel, and celesta
- Aerophones: harmonium, and bayan
- Strings: harp, sixteen 1st violins, sixteen 2nd violins, twelve violas, twelve cellos, eight double basses, and banjo
- Onstage: two trumpets, two cornets, two alto horns, two tenor horns, two baritone horns, and two bass horns
- Offstage: piccolo, two flutes, oboe, two clarinets in B-flat, bassoon, two French horns, three trumpets, three trombones, bass tuba, bass drum, snare drum, triangle, and one pair of crash cymbals

== Suite ==
Shostakovich extracted a suite from the ballet, Op. 22a, in four movements:

1. Introduction (Allegro non troppo)
2. Adagio
3. Polka (Allegretto)
4. Danse

The Polka was reused as the second of his Two Pieces for String Quartet in 1931. He also arranged the Polka for solo piano (Op. 22b) and piano four hands (Op. 22c), in 1935 and 1962 respectively.

== Revivals ==
In 1982, Yury Grigorovich and Isaak Glikman revived the ballet with a new libretto. Grigorovich also chose to integrate other works of Shostakovich into the score. In 1983, he created The Golden Age for Irek Mukhamedov, who defined the role of Boris, the young workers' leader, for successive generations of Bolshoi dancers. They moved the action to the USSR in the 1920s to a restaurant called "The Golden Age". Conflict unfolded between the Soviet Komsomol and the gang. The premiere took place on 4 November 1982 in Moscow's Bolshoi Theatre.

In 2006, the playwright Konstantin Uchitel wrote a new libretto for the same music. The action was set in present day. An old man and old woman meet and remember their youth. The premiere took place on 28 June 2006 at the Mariinsky Theatre.
