= List of productions of The Nutcracker =

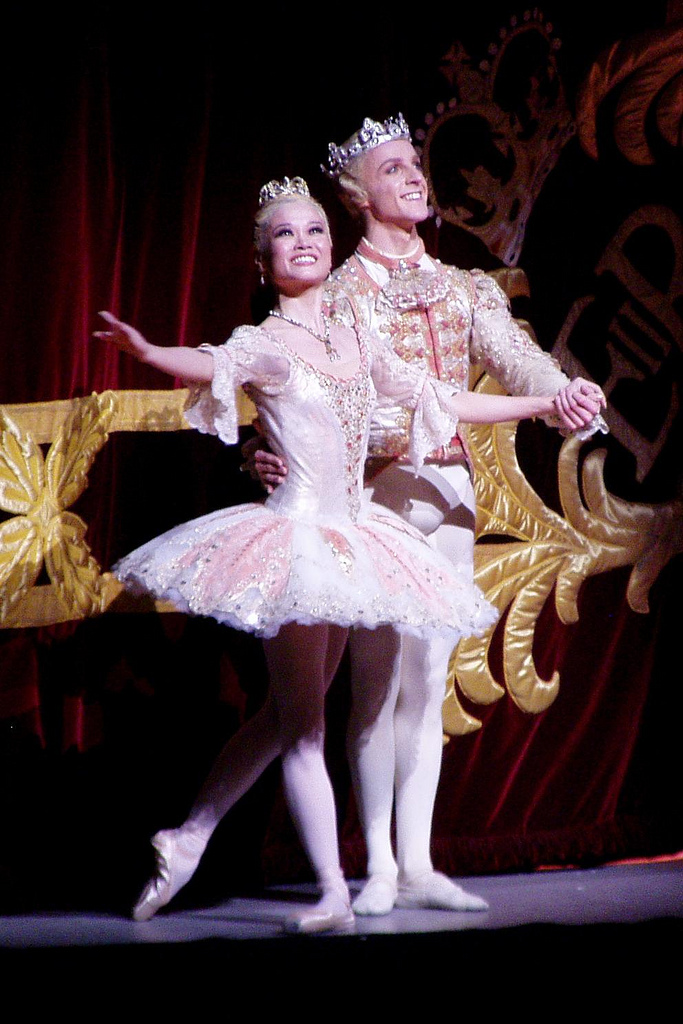
Miyako Yoshida and Steven McRae as the Sugar Plum Fairy and her Cavalier in a production of The Nutcracker by Peter Wright for The Royal Ballet (2009)

Although the original 1892 Marius Petipa production was not a success, Pyotr Ilyich Tchaikovsky's ballet The Nutcracker began to slowly enjoy worldwide popularity after Balanchine first staged his production of it in 1954. It may now be the most popular ballet in the world.

In Russia, choreographer Alexander Gorsky staged a new version of the work in 1919 that addressed many of the criticisms of the original 1892 production by casting adult dancers in the roles of Clara and the Prince, rather than children. This not only introduced a love interest into the story by making Clara and the Prince adults, but provided the dancers portraying Clara and the Prince with more of an opportunity to participate in the dancing.

The first complete performance outside Russia took place in England in 1934, staged by Nicholas Sergeyev after Petipa's original choreography. An abridged version of the ballet, performed by the Ballet Russe de Monte-Carlo, was staged in New York City in 1940 by Alexandra Fedorova - again, after Petipa's version.

The ballet's first complete United States performance was on 24 December 1944, by the San Francisco Ballet, staged by its artistic director Willam Christensen. The New York City Ballet gave its first annual performance of George Balanchine's staging of The Nutcracker in 1954. The tradition of performing the complete ballet at Christmas eventually spread to the rest of the United States. Since Vasili Vainonen's 1934 version in Russia, and Balanchine's 1954 New York City Ballet production, many other choreographers have made their own versions. Some institute the changes made by Gorsky and Vainonen respectively while others, like Balanchine, utilize the original libretto. Some notable productions include those by Rudolf Nureyev for the Royal Ballet, Yuri Grigorovich for the Bolshoi Ballet, Mikhail Baryshnikov for the American Ballet Theatre, and Peter Wright for the Royal Ballet and the Birmingham Royal Ballet. In recent years, revisionist productions, including those by Mark Morris, Matthew Bourne, and Mikhail Chemiakin have appeared, which depart radically from both the original 1892 libretto and Gorsky's revival.

In addition to annual live stagings of the work, many productions have also been televised and/or released on home video. The ballet has also brought attention to "The Nutcracker and the Mouse King", the original 1816 story by E.T.A. Hoffmann, which is now the source material for various animated and live action films. Tchaikovsky's music, especially The Nutcracker Suite, a selection of eight pieces from the complete score, has become extremely popular. The suite (sans the Miniature Overture and the March) was featured in the popular 1940 Disney film Fantasia.

== Stage ==
=== 20th century ===
==== Snowflakes — Ivan Clustine/Anna Pavlova (1911) ====
- Choreography: Ivan Clustine
- Company: Anna Pavlova
- Premiere: 1911

When Anna Pavlova formed her own troupe, she adapted the Journey through the Pine Forest and Waltz of the Snowflakes scenes into a ballet called Snowflakes, with which she toured the United States and Europe from 1911 until her death in 1931. Although only a small fraction of the complete work, Pavlova's adaptation is significant for being the first time the Journey through the Pine Forest music was used for a pas de deux between a Snow Queen and a Snow King. This music would also later be utilized for a first act pas de deux between Clara and the Nutcracker Prince by Vasily Vainonen in his production for the Mariinsky Ballet, by Kurt Jacob for his German-American television production of the 1960s (see the section Television Presentations below), by Mikhail Baryshnikov for his famous production with American Ballet Theatre, by Kent Stowell for Pacific Northwest Ballet, and by Peter Wright for his Royal Ballet production and Birmingham Royal Ballet productions. The Snow Queen/King would later be featured in some subsequent productions, including Helgi Tomasson's for the San Francisco Ballet.

==== Alexander Gorsky (1919) ====
- Choreography: Alexander Gorsky (after Petipa)
- Company: Bolshoi Ballet, Moscow
- Premiere: 1919

Russian choreographer Alexander Gorsky, who staged a production of The Nutcracker in Moscow in 1919, is credited with the idea of combining Clara and the Sugar Plum Fairy's roles (i.e. giving the Fairy's dances to Clara), eliminating the Sugar Plum Fairy's Cavalier, giving the Cavalier's dances to the Nutcracker Prince, and having the roles of Clara and the Nutcracker Prince danced by adults, thereby introducing a reason for a love interest between the two characters that had not been present in the original ballet.

==== Ninette de Valois (1934) ====
- Choreography: Nicholas Sergeyev after Marius Petipa
- Company: Vic-Wells Ballet
- Premiere 30 January 1934, Sadler's Wells, London

The first staging outside of Russia. Former Imperial ballet regisseur Nicholas Sergeyev, who had escaped from the Bolsheviks with the notations for many classic ballet productions in his luggage, staged the London production based on Marius Petipa's original. The cast was headed by Alicia Markova, and also included Elsa Lanchester in the Arabian Dance and the young 'Margaret Fontes' (later Margot Fonteyn) and Annabel Farjeon as snowflakes. Constant Lambert was the musical director and conductor. The ballet was presented "with only a few cuts".

==== Vasily Vainonen (1934) ====
- Choreography: Vasily Vainonen
- Company: Mariinsky Ballet
- Premiere: 1934, Mariinsky Theatre, Leningrad

In 1934, Soviet choreographer Vasili Vainonen staged his complete version of the ballet in the USSR. Vainonen followed Gorsky in departing from the original 1892 production, particularly in his casting adult dancers in the roles of Clara (called Masha in this production) and the Prince, having them perform the second act Grand Pas de Deux originally intended for the Sugar Plum Fairy and her Cavalier (who are omitted from the production altogether), augmenting the role of Drosselmeyer, and concluding the ballet with Masha's realization that the fantasy sequences were a dream. Many subsequent productions, including those by Nureyev and Baryshnikov, have adopted these changes.

The production was revived in 1954, and received a special staging at the Mariinsky Theatre in St. Petersburg (known as Leningrad during the Communist era) to commemorate the 100th anniversary of the ballet's premiere in 1992. In 1994, with sets and costumes first used in its 1954 revival, the Vainonen version was staged again, starring Larissa Lezhnina as Masha, Victor Baranov as the Nutcracker / Prince, and Piotr Russanov as Drosselmeyer. This revival was videotaped and released on DVD.

Another revival of this production has been shown in movie theatres in 3D, and a new DVD of it, starring Alina Somova and Vladimir Shklyarov, was released in December 2012, both in a regular version and on Blu-ray. It was also telecast in 2012 and 2013 on Ovation Channel's "Battle of the Nutcrackers".

==== Alexandra Fedorova (1940) ====
- Choreography: Alexandra Fedorova, after Lev Ivanov
- Company: Ballet Russe de Monte Carlo
- Premiere: October 17, 1940. 51st Street Theater, New York City

Although abridged, this production is notable for being the first time The Nutcracker (beyond excerpts) was performed in America.

==== Willam Christensen (1944) ====
- Choreography: Willam Christensen
- Company: San Francisco Ballet
- Premiere: December 24, 1944, San Francisco

In 1944, Christensen created the first complete production in America with the help of George Balanchine (who would go on to choreograph his own production ten years later) and Alexandra Danilova. Both of them were familiar with the 1892 version:

"Ballet Russe passed through San Francisco and one evening I got Alexandra Danilova and Balanchine, then ballerina of Ballet Russe and ballet master respectively, to come to my apartment," recalls Christensen. "We had something to eat and drink, and then we got down to work with the conductor. Balanchine described the Maryinsky production: how the big doors opened on the tree, the mime of Drosselmeyer, all the details. At one point, Danilova started dancing Clara's variation, in her stocking feet and street dress. Balanchine put an end to that with his admonishment, 'No, no, Alexandra, don't try to show him the actual steps. Let him create his own choreography.' We worked all night, and that is how I got my first Nutcracker... I never intended it to become an annual production, but there you are, it is a tradition now!"

— Willam Christensen, choreographer of San Francisco Ballet's 1944 Nutcracker

Christensen himself performed the role of the Cavalier. Gisella Caccialanza, the wife of Lew Christensen, danced the rôle of the Sugar Plum Fairy. One of the other dancers in the production was Onna White, who would later choreograph The Music Man on both stage and screen, as well as the 1968 film version of "Oliver!".

The staging was a success, and one critic wrote: "We can't understand why a vehicle of such fantastic beauty and originality could be produced in Europe in 1892 with signal success [sic] and never be produced in its entirety in this country until 1944. Perhaps choreographers will make up for lost time from now on." The company was the first in the U.S. to make the ballet an annual tradition, and for ten years, the only company in the United States performing the complete ballet. The company has performed The Nutcracker annually in subsequent versions by Lew Christensen and Helgi Tomasson respectively.

On New Year's Day, 1965, ABC-TV telecast a one-hour abridgment of Lew Christensen's 1964 version. Cynthia Gregory danced the role of the Sugar Plum Fairy and dancer Terry Orr was the Snow King.

==== George Balanchine (1954) ====
- Choreography: George Balanchine, after Marius Petipa and Lev Ivanov
- Company: New York City Ballet
- Premiere: February 2, 1954, City Center of Music and Drama, New York City

In 1954 George Balanchine followed in Christensen's footsteps by choreographing and premiering his now-famous New York City Ballet version, adhering closely to the libretto of the original 1892 version (recollected from revivals in which he had performed the role of the Prince as a young boy in Russia):

"[The Nutcracker] has almost become a kind of annual Christmas ritual in many American and Canadian cities. Of course, this was not always so. We used to rely on a touring company to give us a truncated version of this full-length work, a ballet people used to call Nutcracker Suite because people knew the music better than the ballet. Now all that is different... I have liked this ballet from the first time I danced in it as a boy when I did small roles in the Maryinsky Theatre production. When I was fifteen, I danced the Nutcracker Prince. Years later in New York, when our company decided to do an evening-long ballet, I preferred to turn to The Nutcracker, with which American audiences were not sufficiently familiar. I accordingly went back to the original score, restored cuts that had been made, and in the development of the story chose to use the original E.T.A. Hoffmann, although keeping the outlines of the dances as given at the Maryinsky. A prologue was added and the dances restaged."

— George Balanchine, choreographer of the New York City Ballet's 1954 Nutcracker

This version remained faithful to the original production in its casting actual children in the roles of Marie (Clara) and the Nutcracker Prince, even reconstructing some of the original choreography for the Prince's pantomime and the Grand Pas de Deux for the Sugar Plum Fairy and her Cavalier in Act II. Balanchine made some musical edits for his production, adding an entr'acte originally composed for Act II of The Sleeping Beauty (used as a transition between the departure of the guests and the battle with the mice in Act I), moving the Dance of the Sugar Plum Fairy to earlier in Act II, and excising the Tarantella variation intended for the Cavalier during the Grand Pas de Deux. Balanchine also departed from the original production on some points. For instance, while in the original production the Waltz of the Flowers was performed by eighteen male-female couples, Balanchine utilized a group of fourteen female dancers led by a Dew Drop soloist. Other changes reflect a return to Hoffmann's original tale. For instance, Balanchine used Hoffmann's original name for the heroine, Marie Stahlbaum (rather than Clara Silberhaus as in the 1892 production), and introduced a nephew for Drosselmeyer who appears in the party scene and later as the Nutcracker Prince.

The production premiered on February 2, 1954 at the New York City Center, starring Alberta Grant as Marie, Michael Arshansky as Drosselmeyer, Paul Nickel as the Nutcracker Prince, Maria Tallchief as the Sugar Plum Fairy, Nicholas Magallanes as the Cavalier. It enjoyed huge popularity in New York and has been performed by the New York City Ballet every year since its premiere. Annual performances now take place at the David H. Koch Theater at Lincoln Center. This version has been broadcast three times on live television - first, in an abridged form in 1957, by CBS on the TV anthology The Seven Lively Arts. This marked the first telecast not only of the Balanchine version but of any staging of the ballet. CBS's Playhouse 90 broadcast a more complete (but still abridged) version of the Balanchine Nutcracker, narrated by actress June Lockhart, who was then starring as the mother in CBS's Lassie, in 1958; it was the first Nutcracker broadcast in color. There were only four commercial breaks. This television production starred Diana Adams as the Sugar Plum Fairy, the then ten-year-old Bonnie Bedelia as Clara, and Robert Maiorano as the Nutcracker Prince. The latest revival of the production was telecast on Live from Lincoln Center during the 2011 Christmas season on PBS. It was PBS's first-ever telecast of the Balanchine Nutcracker, but was not seen in some areas because the local PBS stations there decided to substitute their own program choices (not necessarily artistic or musical). The Atlanta PBS stations, for instance, substituted self-help specials from Suze Orman and others, as they often do now during their pledge drives. This 2011 telecast of The Nutcracker has so far not appeared complete online, and has not been released on DVD because Live from Lincoln Center customarily refuses to release its programs on video, due to difficulties involving paying royalties to the various parties involved. This production was nominated for an Emmy Award.

In addition to the New York City Ballet, Balanchine's version of The Nutcracker is currently performed annually by six other ballet companies in the United States: Alabama Ballet, the Central Pennsylvania Youth Ballet, the Miami City Ballet, the Oregon Ballet Theatre, The Pennsylvania Regional Ballet, the Pennsylvania Ballet, and since 2015, the Pacific Northwest Ballet. It was previously performed at the Stamford Center for the Arts in Stamford, Connecticut and by the Pittsburgh Ballet Theatre. From 1966 to 1994, the Atlanta Ballet staged the complete Balanchine version annually (after having performed only Act II for eight years); the company now performs choreographer John McFall's version. Balanchine's version was also first staged at La Scala in 2018, designed by Margherita Palli and starring Nicoletta Manni and Timofej Andrijashenko as the Sugar Plum Fairy and her Cavalier, and at the Royal Danish Ballet in 2023.

==== Rudolf Nureyev (1963) ====
- Choreography: Rudolf Nureyev, after Vasily Vainonen
- Company: Royal Ballet
- Premiere: November, 1967, Royal Opera House, Covent Garden, London

In 1963, Rudolf Nureyev created his own version of Tchaikovsky's work with the Royal Ballet, in which he starred with Merle Park as Clara. Nureyev had previously performed the role of the Nutcracker Prince in Vainonen's version as a student at the Leningrad Ballet school in February 1958. Nureyev's production adopts many of Gorsky and Vainonen's alterations to the original 1892 version, including casting adult dancers in the roles of Clara and the Prince, eliminating the Sugar Plum Fairy, and having Clara awaken to realize the fantasy sequences were a dream. Rostislav Doboujinsky created the mouse masks and costumes for the 1967 production in Stockholm.

The production was videotaped for British television in 1968 and is available on DVD. As far as is known, it has never been telecast on U.S. television. Nureyev played the roles of Drosselmeyer and the Nutcracker Prince, while Wayne Sleep portrayed the Nutcracker. Some critics considered this a Freudian touch, taking it to mean that it is not the Nutcracker who turns into a Prince, but Drosselmeyer. However, this is not necessarily obvious to viewers of the DVD of this production. This production was revived twice by the Paris Opera Ballet in a heavily revised version, in 1988 with Elisabeth Maurin as Clara and Laurent Hilaire as Drosselmeyer and the Prince, and in 2008 with Myriam Ould-Braham as Clara and Jérémie Bélingard in these roles. Neither of those productions have been telecast on U.S. television.

==== Yuri Grigorovich (1966) ====
- Choreography: Yuri Grigorovich
- Company: Bolshoi Ballet
- Premiere: 1966, Bolshoi Theatre, Moscow

In 1966, Yuri Grigorovich created his own version of The Nutcracker for the Bolshoi Ballet, utilizing many of the changes made by Vasily Vainonen for his 1934 production, including the casting of adult dancers in the roles of the heroine (called Maria rather than Clara in this version) and the Nutcracker Prince, and the omission of the Sugar Plum Fairy and her Cavalier. In this version, all of the toys take part in the Journey Through the Snow sequence, rather than being offstage while Maria and the Prince perform the dance. And, as in the Vainonen version, much of the company also dances along with Maria and the Prince as they perform the Adagio in the Act II Pas de Deux; in fact, Maria and the Prince never have the stage all alone to themselves. As a departure from the original 1892 production, Grigorovich omits the pantomime that the Prince performs "describing" his defeat of the Mouse King at the beginning of Act II. The music for the pantomime is used for the defeat of the Mouse King, who is not killed in the first act as in the original or Vainonen's version, but at the beginning of the second act. The entire score is used, which means that the Dance of the Clowns, cut from the earlier version, is reinstated, though Mother Ginger does not appear, nor do any clowns; the dance is performed by the same dancers who perform the other divertissements.

In this production, although Maria (or Clara) is outfitted with a bridal veil in the Final Waltz in anticipation to her impending wedding to the Nutcracker Prince, she then awakens to find that the fantasy sequences were a dream.

This version was first televised in the New York area only by WNBC-TV in 1977, only two days after CBS first telecast the famous Baryshnikov version. First Lady Betty Ford hosted, and the telecast was unique because the lead dancers had to be replaced halfway through due to injuries. This production was released on videocassette and videodisc in the early '80s by MGM/CBS Home Video, through CBS Video Enterprises; CBS released it on videocassette again in 1984, this time as part of CBS/Fox Video. A revival of it was recorded on video in 1987, with the same two stars of the 1977 Bolshoi production, husband-and-wife team Ekaterina Maximova as Maria and Vladimir Vasiliev as the Nutcracker Prince. Both versions are available on DVD, though the 1977 version, sourced from MGM/CBS's CED release, is considerably rarer than the 1987 version. Another revival of this version was recorded in 1989, starring Natalya Arkhipova as Clara, not Maria as in the earlier version, and Irek Mukhamedov as the Nutcracker Prince (but not the Nutcracker himself; that role is played by a female dancer, Marisa Okothnikova). In this revival the romance between Clara and the Prince is slightly more pronounced than in the earlier Bolshoi version. It is now available on DVD, and has been telecast in the U.S. as part of Ovation TV's annual "Battle of the Nutcrackers".

The first widescreen high-definition revival of the Grigorovich Nutcracker was streamed live to movie theatres in Europe in 2010. The use of the new technique afforded moviegoers the chance to see the production in more vivid colors than had been featured in the earlier versions of the production, especially since the Bolshoi Theatre had been recently renovated. Nina Kaptsova starred as Marie (rather than Clara) and Artem Ovcharenko was the Nutcracker Prince. In December 2018, Grigorovich's Nutcracker for the anniversary of the birth of Galina Ulanova was released on the official YouTube channel.

==== Mikhail Baryshnikov (1976) ====
- Choreography: Mikhail Baryshnikov, after Vasily Vainonen
- Company: American Ballet Theatre
- Premiere: December 21, 1976, John F. Kennedy Center for the Performing Arts, Washington, D.C.

In 1976, the 28-year-old Mikhail Baryshnikov premiered a new version of the ballet for the American Ballet Theatre, with himself in the title role, Marianna Tcherkassky as Clara, and Alexander Minz as Drosselmeyer. The production premiered at the Kennedy Center in Washington, D.C., in December 1976, and received its New York premiere on May 18, 1977 at the Metropolitan Opera House.

Like Nureyev, Baryshnikov adopted many of the changes made by Gorsky and Vainonen, including the casting of adult dancers in the roles of Clara and the Nutcracker Prince, the elimination of the Sugar Plum Fairy while making Drosselmeyer's role more prominent, and a concluding scene in which Clara realizes the fantasy sequences were a dream. This production also utilizes Vainonen's choreography for the Waltz of the Snowflakes. Other changes included having a drunken guest at the Christmas party be the one responsible for breaking the Nutcracker, not Clara's brother Fritz, who is portrayed fairly sympathetically in this version. Clara, meanwhile, does not throw her slipper at the Mouse King during the battle, but a candleholder instead. The Grand Adagio of the Pas de Deux in Act II was made almost into a Pas de Trois, as Drosselmeyer enters the festivities at the Land of Sweets to coax Clara back to reality but she refuses to go. In order to provide a dramatic climax to the story, the adagio was made the penultimate dance in the ballet, coming just before the Final Waltz and Apotheosis.

This production achieved particular popularity when it was recorded for television in 1977, starring Gelsey Kirkland as Clara (one of her few roles captured on video), with Baryshnikov and Minz reprising their roles as the Nutcracker / Prince and Drosselmeyer respectively. The telecast was directed by multi-Emmy-winning choreographer and director Tony Charmoli. Although not televised now as often as it used to be, and despite the fact that it was not shot in high definition or widescreen, it retains its status as the most popular telecast of the ballet even today, having become a huge bestseller on DVD especially during the Christmas season. The television version was not a live performance from the Kennedy Center of the ballet, but a special presentation shot on videotape in a TV studio. NBC had already done this as early as 1955, with its Producers' Showcase version of Tchaikovsky's The Sleeping Beauty, starring Margot Fonteyn (which was, however, presented live in those days of no videotape). This method of presentation permitted far greater freedom of camera movement and more use of different camera angles. The Baryshnikov Nutcracker was videotaped in Toronto, Ontario, Canada. Due to time constraints and the necessity to bring the program in at ninety minutes (counting three commercial breaks), the television version of the Baryshnikov production had to eliminate the Arabian Dance altogether. It was first telecast by CBS in the U.S. as a Christmas season special with limited commercial interruption on December 16, 1977, pre-empting Wonder Woman and Logan's Run for that week. It was re-broadcast by CBS several times, then afterwards many times annually by PBS, usually during their Christmas season pledge drives. In 1997, a slightly edited version of it was telecast on the A&E Network, as part of their Breakfast with the Arts program. The presentation was nominated for an Emmy Award for Outstanding Classical Program in the Performing Arts, and Baryshnikov himself was nominated for an Emmy for Special Classification of Outstanding Individual Achievement. On September 28, 2004, the production was reissued on DVD, remastered and in both 2.0 and 5.1 stereo surround sound. In September 2012, it became one of the few 1970's programs originally recorded on videotape to be released on Blu-ray.

==== Kent Stowell/Maurice Sendak (1983) ====
- Choreography: Kent Stowell
- Company: Pacific Northwest Ballet
- Premiere: December 13, 1983, Seattle Center Opera House, Seattle

In 1981, Kent Stowell, artistic director of the Pacific Northwest Ballet company in Seattle, approached children's author Maurice Sendak to design the sets and costumes for a new production of The Nutcracker:

"My immediate reaction to the request that I design Nutcracker was negative. I was flattered, but my reasons for saying no were plentiful. To begin with, who in the world needed another Nutcracker? ….Of course I did it. We did it together. Most of my doubts and worries were put to rest when Kent and I met for the first time early in 1981 in New York City. I liked him immediately for not wanting me to do Nutcracker for all the obvious reasons but rather because he wished me to join him in a leap into the unknown. He suggested we abandon the predictable Nutcracker and find a fresh version that did honor to Hoffman, Tchaikovsky, and ourselves. Later that year, Kent invited me to Seattle to see the company's old Nutcracker. By then I had fallen in love with the project and after that Christmas of 1981, I set to work in earnest."

— Maurice Sendak, designer of Pacific Northwest Ballet's 1983 Nutcracker

The version they eventually created premiered in December 1983. Unlike previous versions, Stowell and Sendak turned to the original E.T.A. Hoffmann story for inspiration and incorporated some of the darker aspects of Hoffmann's tale. In this production, Clara is portrayed by a young girl up until the defeat of the Mouse King, after which the character is transformed into a young woman and performed by an adult dancer for the remainder of the ballet. Stowell dispenses with the Sugar Plum Fairy and the Confiturembourg setting for Act II altogether, opting instead, according to Sendak, for an exotic port containing a seraglio, in which the Grand Pasha (meant to resemble Drosselmeyer, played by the same performer) has his entourage perform for the couple in honor of their bravery. At the end of Act II, the boat on which Clara and the Prince journey to the Land of Sweets returns to take the Nutcracker and Clara away. Clara expresses reluctance to leave and the Pasha sends the boat away without her. As in the Vainonen, Clara wakes to realize the fantasy sequences were a dream. Sendak and Stowell also added to the original score a duet from Tchaikovsky's opera Pique Dame, to be performed at the Christmas Party.

This production was extremely popular and was revived in Seattle every year after its premiere until 2014. In 1986 it served as the basis for the feature film, Nutcracker: The Motion Picture. In 2014 it completed its 32-year run at McCaw Hall.

==== Peter Wright (1984 and 1990) ====
- Choreography: Peter Wright, after Lev Ivanov
- Company: Royal Ballet
- Premiere: December 20, 1984, Royal Opera House, Covent Garden, London

In 1984, dancer-choreographer Peter Wright created a new production based on the original 1892 production for the Royal Ballet. In doing so, he enlisted the aide of musicologist Roland John Wiley, who had done extensive research on Tchaikovsky's ballets and served as production consultant. Together, they created a production that was closely based on the original by Lev Ivanov. For the Waltz of the Flowers, for instance, Wright utilized the floor patterns designed by Ivanov for the premiere and, unlike many productions, featured a Vivandière doll in Act I as in the original production. Wright departed from the original in the casting of adult dancers in the roles of Clara and the Nutcracker Prince, and omitting Mother Gigogne and her Polichinelles. Unlike Vasily Vainonen's 1934 production, however, the roles of the Sugar Plum Fairy and her Cavalier remain intact. Wright's production, like Balanchine's, incorporates a nephew for Drosselmeyer, named Hans-Peter, but in this production he is actually the Nutcracker Prince, an element featured in the original story by E.T.A. Hoffmann. The sets and costumes were designed by Julia Trevelyan Oman, inspired by the Biedermeier era of 19th century Europe.

This production premiered at the Royal Opera House in December 1984. In 1985, it was recorded by the BBC and televised in the U.S. by A&E, starring Julie Rose as Clara, Guy Niblett as Hans-Peter, Leslie Collier as the Sugar Plum Fairy, and Anthony Dowell as her Cavalier. Wright has stated that of all his productions of the ballet, the 1984 one is the closest to the original, although Clara and Hans-Peter are played by adults. Wright even has the dancing dolls at the Christmas party bursting out of pies, as in the 1892 production.

Wright revised the production in 2001 for the newly renovated Royal Opera House to create an ending in which Clara first believes that she was dreaming her adventures; then in the epilogue, after meeting Hans-Peter again in the real world, she realizes that they actually happened. The revised production was videotaped and televised in the U.S. as part of PBS's Great Performances, starring Alina Cojocaru as Clara, Ivan Putrov as the Nutcracker Prince, Miyako Yoshida as the Sugar Plum Fairy, and Anthony Dowell (this time as Drosselmeyer). These first two versions of the Wright production are available on DVD.

In 2008, again with a new cast (Iohna Loots as Clara, Ricardo Cervera as Hans-Peter, and Gary Avis as Drosselmeyer), the production was streamed live to movie theatres in England, and was presented as a high-definition film in select theatres throughout the U.S. during the 2009 Christmas season. There exist two different versions of this revival. The first one, with Alexandra Ansanelli as the Sugar Plum Fairy, was filmed in 2008, and another one, also with Loots, Cervera and Avis, but with Miyako Yoshida as the Sugar Plum Fairy, was filmed in 2009 and also shown in theatres, and was released on DVD in 2010.

In the 2008 staging, romantic interest between Clara and Hans-Peter is more pronounced than in the other versions of this production: they kiss several times.

The 2009 revival of the Wright production was selected as a candidate in Ovation TV's 2010 "Battle of the Nutcrackers" contest — not the version with Alina Cojocaru as Clara, as has been erroneously stated on some websites. The 2009 production ultimately was chosen as the viewer favorite in the contest. It made its U.S. TV debut on December 6, 2010. The 2010 contest marked the first time that this revival of the production was shown on U.S. television.

- Choreography: Peter Wright
- Company: Birmingham Royal Ballet
- Premiere: December 29, 1990, Birmingham Hippodrome, Birmingham

Wright staged a new version of the ballet in 1990, when the Sadler Wells Royal Ballet moved to Birmingham and became the Birmingham Royal Ballet under his direction. For this production, Wright departed more freely from the 1892 original than in his 1984 Royal Ballet production. In this version, the fantasy sequences are once again a dream, Clara is a ballet student, and her mother is a former ballerina. The production has been particularly praised for John Macfarlane's set designs. In 1994, this version was filmed, starring Irek Mukhamedov as the Nutcracker Prince, Sandra Madgwick as Clara, and once again, Miyako Yoshida as the Sugar Plum Fairy, and was released on DVD by Kultur International Films (as of this writing, Ms. Yoshida has danced the role of the Sugar Plum Fairy more times on video than any other dancer). However, this Birmingham Ballet production has never been telecast in the U.S.

==== The Hard Nut — Mark Morris (1991) ====
- Choreography: Mark Morris
- Company: Mark Morris Dance Group
- Premiere: January 12, 1991, Théâtre Royal de la Monnaie, Brussels

In 1990, American dancer and choreographer Mark Morris began work on The Hard Nut, a contemporary version of The Nutcracker, taking inspiration from the horror-comic artist Charles Burns, whose artwork focuses on the archetypal concepts of guilt, childhood, adolescent sexuality, and poignant, nostalgic portrayals of post-war America. Morris enlisted a team of collaborators with whom he could evoke Burns' black-and-white world: set designer Adrianne Lobel, lighting designer James F. Ingalls, and costume designer Martin Pakledinaz. The Hard Nut was the last of twelve pieces Mark Morris created during his time as Director of Dance at the National Opera House of Belgium.

The Hard Nut premiered on January 12, 1991 at the Théâtre Royal de la Monnaie in Brussels. It was chosen the favorite by viewer votes in 2007, 2008, and 2009 in Ovation TV's annual "Battle of the Nutcrackers". Shortly after the premiere, MMDG returned to the United States, having finished their three-year residency at the Monnaie, but the company returned six months later with film crew in hand for encore performances in Belgium's national opera house, one of which was telecast on PBS in 1992 and was made available on VHS and Laserdisc. The Hard Nut was released on DVD in 2007. This production was nominated for two Emmy Awards.

2010 marked the first year that The Hard Nut was not part of the annual "Battle of the Nutcrackers".

==== Nutcracker! — Matthew Bourne (1992) ====
- Choreography: Matthew Bourne
- Company: Adventures in Motion Pictures
- Premiere: August 26, 1992, Edinburgh Festival, Edinburgh

In 1992, choreographer Matthew Bourne staged a new version of the ballet as part of a double-bill with Tchaikovsky's one-act opera Iolanta (presented by Opera North) to celebrate the centenary of both works. Bourne's version, while retaining Tchaikovsky's score (except the music for Mother Gigogne and her Polichinelles), reworks the traditional libretto. In this version, Clara lives in Dr. Sugar's orphanage. The Nutcracker in this version resembles the ventriloquist dummy Jerry Mahoney after coming to life, and turns into, not a Prince, but a shirtless, muscular man. The Sugar Plum Fairy is replaced by a character named Princess Sugar, a calculating, slutty woman who steals Clara's beau away from her. Instead of abandoning plot development for divertissement in Act II as in the original 1892 production, in Act II of Bourne's production, Clara must find her hunky beau in time to prevent him from marrying Princess Sugar. Clara ultimately awakens in the orphanage to find him hiding under the covers of her bed, ready to whisk her away for a happily-ever-after ending.

"The classical Nutcracker has also become a Christmas tradition, particularly for Mothers and their young dancing school daughters; it's often the first ballet that many people see. It can though, be a difficult story to follow and a bore for the men of the family. I've tried to tell a story for all the family. Adults, kids, girls and boys should all find something to thrill them and touch them in Clara's adventure."

— Matthew Bourne, choreographer of Nutcracker!

The original production was a success and was brought back to the Sadler's Wells Theatre in 1993 and 1994. It was nominated for a 1994 Laurence Olivier Award for "Best New Dance Production" and for a "Best of the Edinburgh Festival Award" by The Scotsman. Bourne revised the production in 2002, which has since been performed in various locations in Britain and the U.S. In 2003, it was telecast on the Bravo channel. It was later released on DVD.

=== 21st century ===
==== Kirill Simonov / Mikhail Chemiakin (2001) ====
- Choreography: Kirill Simonov
- Company: Mariinsky Ballet
- Premiere: February 12, 2001, Mariinsky Theatre, St Petersburg

In 2001, Russian artist Mikhail Chemiakin joined with choreographer Kirill Simonov, at the request of conductor Valery Gergiev, to design a new production of the ballet:

"The music of The Nutcracker is multifaceted and, like all great works, inexhaustible. Each time we return to this music, more and more unexpected layers of this unique 'balletic symphony' unfold... I believe that this ballet has long needed to be freed of the pall of obvious 'childishness', the feeling of a children's matinee. Its music is immeasurably richer in content, more profound, more philosophical... The innovation of the musical interpretation attracted Chemiakin. We restored cuts, brought the tempos into line, and the music suddenly sounded totally different -- shattering the stereotypes and revealing new meanings... We intend to show this production in the world's major venues. We hope that our work will find a warm response in the hearts of theatregoers."

— Valery Gergiev, conductor of the Mariinsky Theatre Orchestra

Like Maurice Sendak and Kent Stowell's 1983 production for the Pacific Northwest Ballet, they would draw on the original story by E.T.A. Hoffmann for inspiration. Chemiakin chose to emphasize some of Hoffmann's darker and more grotesque themes, including those of repressed imagination and childhood alienation (the heroine is shunned by her own parents in this version, although she isn't in the Hoffmann story). As in the original 1892 production, the fantasy sequences are not a dream and the Sugar Plum Fairy still appears (though, like Gorsky's version and Vainonen's 1934 version, Simonov gives her Grand Pas de Deux in Act II to the heroine, called Masha, and the Nutcracker Prince). In one case, Chemiakin deviated sharply from Hoffmann, who gave his story a happy ending by having the heroine marry the Nutcracker Prince, and presumably stay in the Kingdom of Sweets to live happily ever after with him. Instead of Hoffmann's ending or the Apotheosis of the original production, Masha and the Prince, who fall deeply in love and are married offstage, are turned into confections at the top of a giant wedding cake, in danger of being eaten by rats who are climbing and nibbling on it.

The production premiered at the Mariinsky in February 2001, and was performed in the U.S. for the first time in 2003, at the Kennedy Center for the Performing Arts in Washington, D.C. President George W. Bush and his wife Laura attended one of the performances. It was also shown in select movie theatres in high-definition. It has proved highly controversial and has received many withering reviews, which nevertheless praise the dancing of ballerina Irina Golub, who portrays Masha on the DVD made of the production. Russian dance critic Nina Alovert also commented disparagingly of the production, saying that it was "full of uncaring human beings and rats who eat people", and that "The one good person [meaning Masha] is turned into a sugar-coated doll". In Dance View Times, critic George Jackson called it "The Gargoyle Nutcracker", and inexplicably termed Masha, the kindliest character in the production, a "brat" and a "minislut", perhaps partly because of the Act II Pas de Deux, which is made quite sensual in this production, some have even said sexual. On the other hand, Stephen Smoliar published a favorable review of the production, in which he said of the Act II Pas de Deux, "Never before have I found such an erotically charged Pas de Deux (in any ballet)", stating that it represents the moment when Masha and the Nutcracker Prince consummate their relationship, and he complimented Irina Golub for "dancing it so passionately". He also praised choreographer Simonov, and stated that "never before has this eroticism [in the ballet] seemed so relevant." (In the production, the Grand Adagio of the Pas de deux culminates in a passionate kiss between Masha and the Nutcracker Prince, and at the end of the dance, Masha, with a mischievous smile and a knowing glance, looks around the room as if trying to make sure that the others are preoccupied, then grabs the Prince's hand and runs offstage with him, perhaps to be alone with him in private; one blog has even suggested that at this point the couple makes love for the first time. It is left to the viewer to decide.) The ending of this version is quite horrifying, in that it implies that Masha and the Prince have been killed.

This production was filmed in 2007 and released on DVD in 2008, both on Blu-ray and regular format; however, the regular format version rapidly went out-of-print.

In the credits, Chemiakin's name is spelled Shemiakin.

Onstage, Golub and Natalya Sologub alternated in the rôle of Masha in the original stagings of this production, which is still staged by the Mariinsky Ballet.

This version made its U.S. TV debut in December 2011, on Ovation TV's annual "Battle of the Nutcrackers".

==== Helgi Tomasson (2004) ====
- Choreography: Helgi Tomasson
- Company: San Francisco Ballet
- Premiere: December 17, 2004, War Memorial Opera House, San Francisco

In December 2004, artistic director Helgi Tomasson staged a new version of the ballet for the San Francisco Ballet set in San Francisco during the Panama–Pacific International Exposition. (Other productions, such as Robert Joffrey's for the Joffrey Ballet and Septime Webre's for the Washington Ballet have taken a similar route in transplanting the action to America.) Clara is played, for the most part, by a young girl rather than an adult woman.

This production utilizes the basic outline of the original 1892 version, with some departures. For example, as in the Chemiakin and Grigorovich versions, the Nutcracker first "comes to life" at the Christmas party before Clara's dream begins. Rather than a Soldier as in the original 1892 version, it is the Nutcracker that is Drosselmeyer's second life-sized doll. And, rather than throwing her slipper at the Mouse King, Clara humorously arranges with the help of the toy soldiers to get the Mouse King's tail caught in a huge mousetrap, thus enabling the Nutcracker to fatally stab him. Like the Sir Peter Wight production for the Royal Ballet it opens in Drosselmeyer's workplace.

In lieu of the Confiturembourg setting for Act II, Tomasson substitutes a Crystal Palace, like the one featured at the 1915 fair.

As the festivities draw to a close, the Sugar Plum Fairy and Drosselmeyer grant the young girl Clara her greatest Christmas wish and transform her into a beautiful woman to dance in the arms of her Prince, who is played by an adult in this version. Thus, as in Gorsky's version and Vasily Vainonen's 1934 version, the Grand Pas de Deux is danced, not by the Sugar Plum Fairy and her Cavalier, but by the Nutcracker Prince and Clara. Also, like Vainonen's production, Clara awakes on Christmas morning a young girl again, to find that the fantasy sequences were a dream.

In 2007, this version was filmed by KQED and presented in select movie theatres throughout the U.S., Canada, and Europe. The following winter, it was presented on PBS' Dance in America and subsequently released on DVD.

==== Wayne Eagling (2010) ====
Another new version was staged by English National Ballet in 2010, choreographed by the company's former Artistic Director Wayne Eagling and designed by Peter Farmer; it played in London every Christmas for thirteen years.

==== Gelsey Kirkland / Michael Chernov (2013) ====
- Choreography: Gelsey Kirkland
- Company: Gelsey Kirkland Ballet
- Premiere: December 12, 2013, Schimmel Center for the Arts, Pace University, New York City

==== Watkin and Smith (2024) ====
The English National Ballet's Artistic Director Aaron S. Watkin choreographed a new version at the London Coliseum in 2024 with Arielle Smith, designed by Dick Bird, set in Edwardian London. This new production was positively review by The Guardian.

=== Other Productions ===
- English National Ballet (1950) — The English National Ballet staged a new version in 1950, with designs by George Krista.
- David Lichine (1957) — The English National Ballet staged a new version at London's Royal Festival Hall in 1957, choregraphed by David Lichine and with designs by Alexander Benois. It was later reworked as a touring production by Jack Carter in 1965, with updated designs by Norman McDowell.
- Mary Day/Martin Buckner (1961) — Among the first wave of productions in the U.S. after Christensen and Balanchine was the Washington Ballet's production, choreographed by Mary Day with Martin Buckner and Choo San Goh. The production premiered at DAR Constitution Hall with the National Symphony Orchestra in December 1961. The production was subsequently performed at various venues throughout Washington, D.C. including Lisner Auditorium and the Warner Theatre until Day's retirement in 2004, at which point the production was retired and replaced with a new version by Septime Webre, set in 19th century Georgetown.
- Ronald Hynd (1976) — Staged by the London Festival Ballet, Hynd's version of the story gives the heroine an older sister named Louise who falls in love with Drosselmeyer's nephew against the wishes of her parents.
- Peter Schaufuss (1986) — the English National Ballet staged a new version in 1986, set in Russia and choreographed by Peter Schaufuss and with designs by David Walker. In this version, Tchaikovsky was portrayed as the Drosselmeyer figure.
- Robert Joffrey/Gerald Arpino (1987) — In 1987, Robert Joffrey and Gerald Arpino created a version of the ballet for the Joffrey Ballet set in Currier and Ives America. The production has been performed in cities nationwide, including New York City, Washington, D.C., Los Angeles, and ultimately in Chicago where the company established its permanent home in 1995. In 1999, an abridged version of the production was televised on some PBS stations in U.S. as The Joffrey Nutcracker.
- Ben Stevenson (1991) — The English National Ballet commissioned a new version in 1986, once again set in Germany and choreographed by Ben Stevenson.
- Graeme Murphy (1992) — Graeme Murphy's version, entitled "Nutcracker: The Story of Clara", was created in 1992 for the Australian Ballet, released on video in 1994, and released on DVD in 2008. It retains Tchaikovsky's music, but throws out virtually all of the original story, adding some quite intense scenes not found in a usual Nutcracker. In this version, set in the 1950s, Clara is an aging Australian ballerina in a retirement home who recalls her past life in flashback, and dies of old age at the end. There are no magical enchantments in this version, which made a surprise appearance as an additional offering in 2011's Battle of the Nutcrackers.
- Anatoli Emilianov (1993) — Anatoli Emilianov has staged a version for the Moscow Ballet called The Great Russian Nutcracker, in which the second act is set in the "Land of Peace and Harmony". As in the Gorsky and Vainonen versions, Clara performs all of the dances usually performed by the Sugar Plum Fairy, and the Prince performs the Cavalier's dances. New York Times dance critic Alastair Macaulay has criticized what he calls "the production's emphasis on Love, Love, Love," claiming that a romance between Clara and the Nutcracker Prince makes The Nutcracker seem like too many other classical ballets, rather than a unique one which essentially does not have an adult love interest.
- Pär Isberg (1997) — Pär Isberg's version for the Royal Swedish Ballet, staged in 1997, uses most of Tchaikovsky's music, but bears little resemblance to the original ballet, although there still is a Mouse King. In this version, it is a charcoal burner who becomes a handsome Prince, and a housemaid falls in love with him and becomes his Princess. Instead of simply Clara visiting the Kingdom of Sweets, it is two children, Lotta and her brother Petter, who do so. (Some of the new libretto, co-written by Isberg and Erik Näslund, is inspired by Elsa Beskow's children's book "Peter and Lotta's Christmas".) This version is available on DVD only in Great Britain.
- Derek Deane (1997) — Another new version was staged by English National Ballet in 1997, choreographed by the company's former Artistic Director Derek Deane and designed by Sue Blane; in this version, the action was transposed to Belgravia, London.
- Patrice Bart (1999) — Patrice Bart's version, available on DVD, created for the Berlin Staatsoper, and premiered there in 1999, reworks the libretto. The heroine (here called Marie) is an unhappy, traumatized child who finds herself in the care of the cruel Stahlbaum family after her mother is kidnapped by Russian Revolutionaries. Her only friend is Drosselmeyer who here is a young man who helps Marie remember and overcome her repressed trauma. The nutcracker toy, whose uniform reminds Marie of her father, becomes the catalyst for this experience. Drosselmeyer evokes in the revolutionaries (taking the place of the Mice from the traditional staging), enabling Marie to drive them off by throwing her toy nutcracker at them. The toy then explodes, comes to life, and almost immediately turns into a Prince. In the second act, Marie is reunited with her mother. As in Vainonen's 1934 version, there is no Sugar Plum Fairy or Cavalier; their dances are performed by Marie and the Nutcracker Prince. The finale is unclear about Marie and the Prince's fate, but her mother blesses their apparently forthcoming marriage, after which Drosselmeyer suddenly produces another nutcracker, which emits a strange light from its eyes. Most of the dancers suddenly begin moving like mechanical dolls, and through a cloud of smoke, Marie is seen to be seemingly flying off happily with the Prince, Mary Poppins-like, airborne on a giant umbrella. This production appeared on DVD with Nadja Saidakova as Marie and Vladimir Malakhov as the Nutcracker Prince. Daniel Barenboim conducts the orchestra. This version was also shown on U.S. TV in Ovation's 2010 "Battle of the Nutcrackers" and won the 2016 "Battle of the Nutcrackers".
- Maurice Béjart (2000) — Like the Graeme Murphy version, Maurice Béjart's 2000 production throws out the original story altogether, creating all-new characters. Béjart plants his own mother at the center of the story, depicting what looks like a mother and son's incestuous attraction to each other. Here, the main character is named Bim, and is intended to represent Béjart himself. Mephisto and Felix the Cat appear as characters. A piece of set design seen throughout the production resembles a woman's naked torso, with a visible uterus. There is, in addition to the suggestion of incest, a strong gay subtext throughout. The Act I Pas de Deux between Bim and his mother, originally meant to be performed at the point at which the Nutcracker turns into a Prince, is extremely suggestive sexually. The ballet is constantly interrupted by filmed commentary from Béjart himself, and French café songs are also inserted into the production. This one was also a candidate in 2010's "Battle of the Nutcrackers".
- Christopher Hampson (2002) — Another new version was staged by English National Ballet in 2002, choreographed by Christopher Hampson with designs by cartoonist Gerald Scarfe.
- Youri Vamos (2007) — Hungarian choreographer Youri Vámos has created The Nutcracker: A Christmas Story, a version of Tchaikovsky's ballet, released on DVD in 2007, which combines Hoffmann's story with elements from Charles Dickens's A Christmas Carol, to the point of including Ebenezer Scrooge, Bob Cratchit, Mrs. Cratchit, and the Spirit of Christmas as characters. It won the Battle of the Nutcrackers in 2014.
- Gary Harris (2010) - Choreographer Gary Harris has created a production for the New Zealand Ballet which takes place partly in a hospital ward to which Clara is taken after receiving a bump on the head, courtesy of her slingshot-wielding brother Fritz.
- Alexei Ratmansky (2010) — Russian choreographer Ratmansky's production of The Nutcracker, for American Ballet Theatre, premiered at the Brooklyn Academy of Music on Thursday, December 23, 2010, with principal dancers Gillian Murphy and David Hallberg. It uses the original plot, but in this production, during the Pas de deux, the little girl Clara and the boy Nutcracker Prince imagine themselves dancing it as adults, whereupon the principal dancers take over the roles until the Apotheosis of the ballet. The production follows Chemiakin's by beginning the ballet in the Stahlbaum's kitchen (where mice are hiding), in making the snowflakes have a sinister quality, and in having Clara and the Nutcracker Prince kiss onstage near the end. It follows the Bolshoi version in having attendants place a bridal veil on Clara after she accepts the Prince's marriage proposal during the Pas de Deux. And, like the Bolshoi version and many others, it all turns out to have been a dream at the end. The production has received mostly rave reviews, perhaps the best for an ABT "Nutcracker" since Baryshnikov's famous production.
- Cabaret Red Light (2010) — Cabaret Red Light created a burlesque-and-ballet version of The Nutcracker with original score by Rolf Lakaemper and Peter Gaffney, and choreography by Christine Fisler. Directed by Anna Frangiosa and Gaffney, the production draws on material from the original short story by E.T.A. Hoffmann, "The Nutcracker and the Mouse King," aiming to restore scenes, characters and other elements not included in Alexandre Dumas' French adaptation of the holiday classic, and presenting a version that is generally truer to the spirit and uncanny nature of Hoffmann's work. Using a variety of media - shadow puppets, kinetic sculptures, experimental music and narrative dance - Cabaret Red Light's NUTCRACKER revolves around the figure of Marie and her Godfather Drosselmeyer's efforts to warn her about the false promises and counterfeit values that mark the transition into adult life. The production premiered on December 16, 2010, at Painted Bride Art Center in Philadelphia.
- Vasily Medvedev and Yuri Burlaka (2013) - Russian choreographers Vasily Medvedev and Yuri Burlaka staged a reconstruction of the ballet for the Berlin State Ballet with sets and costumes by Andrey Voytenko and Tatiana Noginova, based on the original sketches by Ivan Vsevolozhsky for the 1892 world premiere at the Mariinsky Theatre. This version featured most of the original choreography by Petipa and Ivanov, and even went so far as to restore the reika sequence in the Grand Pas de Deux. The production was released on DVD and Blu-ray in 2015, conducted by Robert Reimer and starring real-life husband and wife Marian Walter as the Nutcracker and Iana Salenko in the double role of Clara\The Sugar Plum Fairy.
- Christopher Wheeldon (2016) - Joffrey Ballet commissioned Christopher Wheeldon to create a working-class version of The Nutcracker. Author Brian Selznick was brought in to create the story. In this version, set in the 1893 Chicago's World's Fair, Marie is a daughter of Polish immigrants, and is raised by her widowed mother. The mother is a sculptor who is sculpting the golden statue of the world's fair. The second act was Marie's fantasy of the world's fair, rather than Land of the Sweets. The Impresario, the Drosselmeyer character of this version and the architect of the world's fair, took Marie to the fair. Marie's mother becomes the golden sculpture, the Sugar Plum Fairy figure of this production. In 2016, the work had its tryouts in Iowa, then premiered in Chicago.
- Michael Pink's Production for Milwaukee Ballet 2003 - English Choreographer Highly regarded for its engaging narrative throughout. Drosselmeyer creates a fantasy journey in which Clara, her brother Fritz and elder sister Marie travel through with Drosselmeyer's nephew Karl. The choreographic invention is most noticeable in the snow pas de deux.

== Film ==
=== Fantasia (1940) ===
Selections from the Nutcracker Suite were heard in the 1940 Disney animated film Fantasia. In this film, the music from The Nutcracker is accompanied by dancing fairies, mushrooms and fish, among others and, as host Deems Taylor mentions in live-action footage, the Nutcracker itself is nowhere in sight. One remark that strikes modern-day viewers strongly if they see the roadshow theatrical release of Fantasia (now on DVD) rather than the more commonly seen general release version, is Taylor's declaration that the full-length Nutcracker "wasn't much of a success and nobody performs it nowadays", a statement that had some validity in 1940, but is certainly not true now. (This remark was edited out of the general release version of Fantasia, which began playing theatres in 1946 and is the one released on VHS.)

As mentioned before, this suite should not be mistaken for the entire Nutcracker. The suite used in Fantasia is a slightly altered version of the Nutcracker Suite selected by the composer. As animated in Fantasia, it does not make use of a Christmas setting at all, although snow and ice are shown near the end of it. This version omits the Overture and the Marche, and the remaining dances are reordered (The accompanying animation is provided in parentheses):

1. Danses caractéristiques

a. Dance of the Sugar-Plum Fairy (Dew Fairies)
b. Chinese Dance (Chinese Mushrooms)
c. Reed-Flutes (Blossoms)
d. Arabian Dance (Goldfish)
e. Russian Dance (Thistles and Orchids)

2. Waltz of the Flowers (Autumn Fairies, Frost Fairies & Snow Fairies)

=== Schelkunchik (1973) ===
Schelkunchik (Nutcracker) is a 1973 Russian animated short based on the story with no dialogue, and features Tchaikovsky's music, not only from The Nutcracker, but also from Swan Lake and The Sleeping Beauty. In this version the heroine is not Clara, the daughter of a distinguished Town Council President, but a lonely chambermaid who works in a large house. When she kisses the Nutcracker, he comes to life, but is ashamed of his appearance. He must fight the Mouse King in order to break the spell placed upon him and become a Prince again. Dancer Mikhail Baryshnikov featured this version in his PBS television series Stories from My Childhood. The U.S. telecast added narration by Shirley MacLaine.

=== Nutcracker: The Motion Picture (1986) ===
The film Nutcracker: The Motion Picture (referred to in the film credits as Pacific Northwest Ballet's Nutcracker) is a feature film based on Kent Stowell's 1983 production of The Nutcracker with sets and costume designs by Maurice Sendak and narration by Julie Harris as the adult voice of Clara. Directed by Carroll Ballard, it was released nationwide in the U.S. on Thanksgiving Day, in 1986. As in the stage version, Clara was played by a young girl (Vanessa Sharp) during the Christmas party and the Battle with the Mice, and an adult dancer (Patricia Barker) throughout the remainder of the ballet (until Clara awakens from her dream). The Nutcracker and the Nutcracker Prince were also played by two dancers in the film: Jacob Rice before the toy's transformation into a Prince, and Wade Walthall throughout the rest of the film. The "Overture" shows Drosselmeyer in his workshop coming up with the idea for and then actually creating/building his special Christmas present. This version introduces hints of sexual tension between Clara and Drosselmeyer; during the Christmas Party, Clara is visibly uneasy around Drosselmeyer, who seems to be leering at her, and at one point even shrinks from his touch. In the dream sequence, there is an obvious rivalry between the Pasha (Drosselmeyer's dream counterpart) and the Nutcracker Prince as the Pasha tries to get Clara to sit with him, against the wishes of the Nutcracker Prince. The ending of the film departs from the stage version. As Clara and her Prince slowly swirl around wrapped in each other's arms while the Apotheosis plays, the Pasha magically levitates them higher and higher into the air as the other dancers wave goodbye. Suddenly, the jealous Pasha points his finger at the couple, which magically causes them to let go of each other. They suddenly begin to freefall, and the Prince again becomes a nutcracker. Just as both are about to hit the ground and presumably be seriously injured or killed, Clara (a young girl again) is jolted awake from her dream. In the film, the Final Waltz is heard during the closing credits (although the Apotheosis is performed during the last moments of the ballet). Drosselmeyer is sleeping at his work desk (with the presumption that the dream was not Clara's but his), on which we see the dancers performing the waltz.

=== The Nutcracker Prince (1990) ===
In 1990, a Canadian animated version, The Nutcracker Prince, starring the voices of Kiefer Sutherland, Megan Follows, and Peter O'Toole, among others, was released. This one also used Tchaikovsky's music, but was actually a straightforward full-length animated cartoon, not a ballet film. The plot follows E.T.A. Hoffmann's original storyline in having the Nutcracker actually be Drosselmeyer's nephew (named Hans in this version), and having Clara meet him in real life at the end. The fantasy elements really do occur in this film version, as in Hoffmann's story. New characters (one of them voiced by Peter O'Toole) are added to the plot.

=== George Balanchine's The Nutcracker (1993) ===
In 1993, George Balanchine's version for the New York City Ballet served as the basis for a full-length feature film called George Balanchine's The Nutcracker, made by Electra Entertainment and Regency Enterprises. It was distributed and released by Warner Bros. The film was directed by Emile Ardolino, with narration spoken by Kevin Kline. The cast includes Jessica Lynn Cohen as Marie, Macaulay Culkin as the Nutcracker, the Prince, and Drosselmeyer's nephew, Darci Kistler as the Sugar Plum Fairy, Kyra Nichols as Dew-Drop, Damian Woetzel as the Fairy's Cavalier, and Wendy Whelan as Coffee. The film was criticized by James Berardinelli for not capturing the excitement of a live performance, stating that it "opts to present a relatively mundane version of the stage production... utilizing almost none of the advantages offered by the (film) medium." Roger Ebert of the Chicago Sun-Times criticized the film for not adapting the dance for a film audience and also its casting of Culkin who, he writes, "seems peripheral to all of the action, sort of like a celebrity guest or visiting royalty, nodding benevolently from the corners of shots." In The Washington Post, Lucy Linfield echoed Ebert's criticism of Culkin, stating that "it's not so much that he can't act or dance; more important, the kid seems to have forgotten how to smile... All little Mac can muster is a surly grimace." She praised the dancing, however, as "strong, fresh and in perfect sync" and Kistler's Sugar Plum Fairy as "the Balanchinean ideal of a romantic, seemingly fragile beauty combined with a technique of almost startling strength, speed and knifelike precision." The New York Times' Stephen Holden also criticized Culkin, calling his performance the film's "only serious flaw", but praised the cinematography as "very scrupulous in the way it establishes a mood of participatory excitement, then draws back far enough so that the classic ballet sequences choreographed by Balanchine and staged by Peter Martins can be seen in their full glory."

=== The Nuttiest Nutcracker (1999) ===
In 1999, a comedy version entitled The Nuttiest Nutcracker became the first computer-animated film released straight to video. An example of the skewed tone that this version took may be inferred from the fact that Phyllis Diller provided the voice of an obese Sugar Plum Fairy. Some of Tchaikovsky's music was used.

=== Barbie in The Nutcracker (2001) ===
This animated film uses generous chunks of Tchaikovsky's music, and is a direct-to-video digitally animated version of the story with, of course, Barbie the doll, released in 2001. (However, Barbie appears not as Clara, but as herself. Clara, though, looks exactly like Barbie, and is still the main character, and her story is told as a story-within-a-film). The film significantly alters the storyline of the Hoffmann tale, adding all sorts of perils not found in the original story, or the ballet. There is even a Stone Monster, sent by the Mouse King, that chases Clara and the Nutcracker. Drosselmeyer is not Clara's godfather but her grandfather, and is depicted as being notably grumpy. It is not Drosselmeyer who gives Clara the Nutcracker, but her aunt, and in this version, Clara is an orphan raised by her grandfather. The Nutcracker, rather than becoming a Prince after his victory in battle, must travel to the Sugar Plum Princess's castle in order for the spell to be broken; defeating the Mouse King is not enough. At the end, Clara turns out to be the Sugar Plum Princess, and her kiss breaks the spell that had been placed on the Nutcracker. Real New York City Ballet dancers were used in the production and rotoscoped in order to properly capture ballet movements - the Trepak, the Adagio from the pas de deux, and the Dance of the Sugar Plum Fairy are performed much as they would be in a live production of The Nutcracker. Peter Martins served as choreographer. In this version, the Prince asks Clara to stay on as his Queen, even telling her "I love you". But Clara is unwillingly sent home by the shrunken Mouse King, and awakens back in her parlor. However, the couple is reunited when Clara's aunt brings "the son of a friend" over to visit for Christmas. In this version, the Mouse King does not die until near the end. The film also features touches of (sometimes deliberately anachronistic) humor: after the battle with the mice, the Nutcracker, who has not yet regained his form as a Prince, says to Clara, "Thank you for saving my life, and for your superior nursing skills". During the early part of her adventures, Clara maintains a skeptical attitude, even saying "This is crazy" at one point.

=== The Nutcracker and the Mouse King (2004) ===
In 2004, Argus International in Moscow produced an animated version of "The Nutcracker and the Mouse King", based on the original story by E.T.A. Hoffmann. The English version was released in 2005 and features the voices of Leslie Nielsen as the Mouse King, Robert Hays as the mouse Squeak, Fred Willard as the mouse Bubble, and Eric Idle (of Monty Python fame) as the voice of Herr Drosselmeyer.

=== The Secret of the Nutcracker (2007) ===
The Secret of the Nutcracker, a 2007 Canadian made-for-television film which uses some of the ballet characters as well as Tchaikovsky's music, has never been telecast in the U.S., but has been released on DVD. This version, a dramatic film which uses a new plot, features Brian Cox as Drosselmeyer. This "retelling" is set during World War II, and makes Clara's father a prisoner of war. Nazis also feature in this adaptation.

=== The Nutcracker in 3D (2010) ===
The Nutcracker in 3D (also known as Nutcracker: The Untold Story) is a feature-length musical variation in 3-D on the tale set in 1920s Vienna, featuring John Turturro as the Rat King, Elle Fanning as Mary (rather than Clara) and Nathan Lane as a young Albert Einstein, here known only as Uncle Albert. Originally scheduled to be released during the Christmas holiday season of 2009, it reportedly began showing in European countries as early as February 2009, and was released in the U.S. just before Thanksgiving in 2010. The film is written and directed by Andrei Konchalovsky. The music for the songs in this film is adapted from different works by Tchaikovsky, and the lyrics are by Tim Rice. The film is set in 1920s Vienna. Konchalovsky evokes Adolf Hitler and the SS through the Rat King and his army. The film has received nearly unanimously unfavorable reviews.

=== A Nutcracker Christmas (2016) ===
A Nutcracker Christmas is a Christmas film originally broadcast on the Hallmark Channel in 2016. The film premiered on Lifetime December 10, 2016. It stars Amy Acker as Lily, Sascha Radetsky as Mark, Sophia Lucia as Sadie. The film presents Lily's dreams and ballet career, and leads up to her Nutcracker performance as the Sugar Plum fairy. As a movie, only selected scenes of the entire 1892 two-act Nutcracker ballet are shown.

=== The Nutcracker and the Four Realms (2018) ===
The Nutcracker and the Four Realms is a 2018 American fantasy adventure film released by Walt Disney Studios Motion Pictures in the United States on November 2, 2018 in RealD 3D and Dolby Cinema. The film was directed by Lasse Hallström and Joe Johnston and written by Ashleigh Powell, and is a retelling of E. T. A. Hoffmann's short story "The Nutcracker and the Mouse King" and Marius Petipa's The Nutcracker about a young girl who is gifted a locked egg from her deceased mother and sets out in a magical land to retrieve the key. The film stars Keira Knightley, Mackenzie Foy, Eugenio Derbez, Matthew Macfadyen, Richard E. Grant, and Misty Copeland, with Helen Mirren and Morgan Freeman.

== Television presentations ==
Please see the Stage section above for more information about televised versions by George Balanchine, Mikhail Baryshnikov, Matthew Bourne, Lew Christensen, Mark Morris, Rudolf Nureyev, Mikhail Chemiakin, Helgi Tomasson, and Peter Wright. Other televised versions are noted below:

- In 1961, then-husband-and-wife Robert Goulet and Carol Lawrence starred in a musical ABC-TV Christmas special entitled The Enchanted Nutcracker, with a libretto by Samuel and Bella Spewack. It was directed by Jack Smight. Patrick Adiarte and Pierre Olaf co-starred. Very little information is currently available on this telecast, and no video clips have been made available, so it is difficult to know just what, if any, portions of the Tchaikovsky ballet were used. This special appears to have been notably unsuccessful, having been telecast only once and never being made available on VHS or DVD, or for that matter, online.
- A made-for-TV filmed color German-American production of The Nutcracker was first telecast in the United States as a Christmas season special by CBS on December 21, 1965. Choreographed by Kurt Jacob, it featured a largely German, but still international cast made up from several companies, including Edward Villella (the Nutcracker/Prince), Patricia McBride (the dream Clara) and Melissa Hayden (the Sugar Plum Fairy) from the New York City Ballet. A little girl portrayed Clara in the "real" sequences. First televised in Germany in 1964, this production aired on CBS annually between 1965 and 1968, and then was withdrawn from American network television, but after more than forty years it has resurfaced nationally on a Warner Archive DVD. Videotaped "wraparound" host segments in English, made in the style of those that CBS manufactured for their 1959 and 1960's telecasts of MGM's The Wizard of Oz, featured Eddie Albert (at that time starring in the CBS long-running hit Green Acres), as host; he also narrated the story offscreen. These segments were added to the program for its showings in the U.S. New opening and closing credits were also added in English. All of these are included on the DVD along with the actual film. Famed German dancer Harald Kreutzberg appeared (in what was probably his last rôle) in the dual rôles of Drosselmeyer and the Snow King (though in one listing, Drosselmeyer has been re-christened Uncle Alex Hoffman — presumably a reference to E.T.A. Hoffmann, who wrote the original tale).

This production cut the ballet down to a one-act version lasting slightly less than an hour, and drastically re-ordered all the dances, even to the point of altering the storyline to somewhat resemble that of The Wizard of Oz, which, at that time, was an enormously successful annual attraction on U.S. network television. The Mouse King, although having turned the Prince into a Nutcracker, does not even appear in this production. Instead, as Clara's dream begins, she and the Nutcracker must now journey to the Castle of the Sugar Plum Fairy, where the Fairy will wave her wand and turn him back into a Prince. Along the way, much like Oz's Dorothy, the couple encounters several fantastic characters - the waltzing snowflakes, the Russian Dancers, Mother Ginger and her Clowns, the Bluebirds, and the waltzing flowers. Villella does not wear a Nutcracker mask at all in this production; he is seen throughout as a normal-looking man, and the only way that one can tell that he has been transformed from a nutcracker into a prince is by his change in costume. The two bluebirds from Tchaikovsky's The Sleeping Beauty appear to perform the Dance of the Reed Flutes rather than Sleeping Beauty's Bluebird Pas de Deux. The famous March is not heard during the actual ballet, but only during the new opening credits and hosting sequence devised by CBS. The March comes to a sudden halt as host Eddie Albert cracks a nut with a nutcracker that he has beside him on a table.

=== Battle of the Nutcrackers ===
Ever since 2007, Ovation TV has held their annual "Battle of the Nutcrackers" viewing contest, giving their audience a choice of which Nutcracker to choose as the best.

In 2007, the competitors were George Balanchine's The Nutcracker (the 1993 film version with the New York City Ballet and Macaulay Culkin), the Bolshoi Ballet's The Nutcracker, Matthew Bourne's Nutcracker! and Mark Morris' The Hard Nut. The Hard Nut was the winner.

In 2008, the competition included six competitors: Matthew Bourne's Nutcracker!, the Bolshoi Ballet's The Nutcracker, the 1993 film version of George Balanchine's The Nutcracker, the Pacific Northwest Ballet's Nutcracker: The Motion Picture (with designs and costumes by Maurice Sendak), Bejart's Nutcracker and Mark Morris' The Hard Nut. The Hard Nut won for a second year.

In Ovation's 2009 Battle, the competitors were Mark Morris' The Hard Nut, the London Royal Ballet's The Nutcracker, the Ballet of Monte Carlo's Casse Noisette Circus (Casse Noisette is French for "Nutcracker"), the Bolshoi Ballet's The Nutcracker, and Maurice Bejart's Nutcracker. Once again, the winner was The Hard Nut.

The 2010 "Battle of the Nutcrackers" began its run on December 6, 2010. It included two very traditional versions - the 1989 Bolshoi Ballet's Nutcracker and the 2009 Royal Ballet Nutcracker - as well as the Berlin State Opera Ballet's Nutcracker, Maurice Bejart's Nutcracker, and the Ballet of Monte Carlo's Casse Noisette Circus. The winner was the Royal Ballet version.

The 2011 lineup included the following competitors: the Mariinsky's The Nutcracker, the London Royal Ballet's The Nutcracker, the Berlin State Opera Ballet's Nutcracker, the Bolshoi Ballet's The Nutcracker and Matthew Bourne's Nutcracker!. An additional version, Nutcracker: The Story of Clara, another radical reworking of the ballet, was also telecast. As in 2010, the Royal Ballet version was the winner.

For 2012, contestants included the following: the London Royal Ballet's The Nutcracker, Matthew Bourne's Nutcracker!, the Bolshoi Ballet's The Nutcracker, Nutcracker: The Story of Clara, two Mariinsky Nutcrackers (2008 and 2012 respectively), and the San Francisco Ballet's The Nutcracker. The winner was the San Francisco version.

For 2013, the contestants once again included the Mariinsky's 2012 Nutcracker, Matthew Bourne's Nutcracker!, Nutcracker: The Story of Clara, and the San Francisco Ballet's The Nutcracker. The winner, shown on December 23, was the San Francisco version.

For 2014, the contestants were Youri Vamos' The Nutcracker: A Christmas Story, the 2000 version of the London Royal Ballet's The Nutcracker, the Bolshoi Ballet's Nutcracker and the Mariinsky's 2012 Nutcracker. The winner, shown on December 22, was Youri Vamos' The Nutcracker: A Christmas Story.

For 2015, the contestants were the 1993 film version of the New York City Ballet's Nutcracker, the Dutch National Ballet's The Nutcracker and the Mouse King, Das Wiener Staatsballett's 2014 Nutcracker and the Bonn Ballet's Nutcracker. The winner, shown on December 21, was The Dutch National Ballet's The Nutcracker And The Mouse King.

For 2016, the contestants were the Berlin State Opera-Malakhov's 1999 Nutcracker, the Bolshoi Ballet's Nutcracker, the Mariinsky's 2012 Nutcracker, Das Wiener Staatsballett's 2014 Nutcracker and the Semperoper Ballet's Nutcracker. The winner, shown on December 19, was the Berlin State Opera-Malakhov version.

For 2017, the announced contestants were the Australian Ballet's Peter Wright's The Nutcracker, the Dutch National Ballet's The Nutcracker and the Mouse King, the Semperoper Ballet's Nutcracker, the Berlin State Opera-Malakhov's 1999 Nutcracker and the Royal Opera House's 2016 Nutcracker. The winner, announced on December 18, was again the Berlin State Opera-Malahkov version.

For 2018, the contestants were the Berlin State Opera-Malakhov's 1999 Nutcracker, the Royal Opera House's 2016 Nutcracker, the Mariinsky's 2012 Nutcracker, the Czech National Ballet's 2017 The Nutcracker and the Cuddly Mouse and the Opernhaus Zurich's 2018 The Nutcracker. The winner, broadcast on December 24, was the Opernhaus Zurich production.

For 2019, the contestants were The Australian Ballet's production of Peter Wright's Nutcracker, the Royal Opera House's 2016 Nutcracker, the Mariinsky's 2012 Nutcracker, the Czech National Ballet's 2017 The Nutcracker and the Cuddly Mouse and the Opernhaus Zurich's 2018 The Nutcracker.

For 2020, the contestants are the Mariinsky's 2012 Nutcracker, the Czech National Ballet's 2017 The Nutcracker and the Cuddly Mouse and the Opernhaus Zurich's 2018 The Nutcracker.

The 2021 version features the Redondo ballets version.

The 2021 version was the last year to do so.

== Other versions ==
=== Animated ===
In addition to the ones mentioned above, there have been several other animated versions of the original story, but none can really be actually considered an animated version of the ballet itself. All of these invent characters that appear neither in the original E.T.A. Hoffmann story nor in the ballet.

- In 1979, a stop-motion puppet version, entitled Nutcracker Fantasy, was released, using some of the Tchaikovsky music. This version featured the voices of Christopher Lee as Drosselmeyer, and Melissa Gilbert as Clara.
- Care Bears: The Nutcracker was a 1988 animated short based extremely loosely on the original ballet. It was made for video, and was first shown on TV on the Disney Channel.
- The Jetlag Productions animation studio produced its own version of the story in 1994 entitled, simply "The Nutcracker". The animated adaptation used some of Tchaikovsky's compositions as well as some original melodies and songs.

=== The Nutcracker on Ice ===
Various versions of the ballet featuring ice-skating have been made:

- In The Nutcracker: a Fantasy on Ice, a television adaptation for ice skating from 1983 starring Dorothy Hamill and Robin Cousins, narrated by Lorne Greene, and telecast on HBO, Tchaikovsky's score underwent not only reordering, but also insertion of music from his other ballets and also of music from Mikhail Ippolitov-Ivanov's Caucasian Sketches. Drosselmeyer did not appear at all in this version. Some years later, Ms. Hamill and then-husband Kenneth Forsythe produced a more complete ice ballet version for the stage, which was broadcast (in somewhat abridged form) in 1990 on NBC's Sportsworld, co-narrated by Hamill herself and Merlin Olsen. This version featured Nathan Birch as the Prince, J. Scott Driscoll as the Nutcracker, and Tim Murphy as Drosselmeyer.
- Another ice skating version, 1994's Nutcracker on Ice, starring Oksana Baiul as Clara and Victor Petrenko as Drosselmeyer, was originally telecast on NBC, and is now shown on several cable stations. It was also condensed to slightly less than an hour, radically altering and compressing both the music and the storyline.
- Still another one-hour ice skating version, also called Nutcracker on Ice, was staged on television in 1995, starring Peggy Fleming as the Sugar Plum Fairy, Nicole Bobek as Clara, and Todd Eldredge as the Nutcracker.
- And yet another version of Nutcracker on Ice, this one starring Tai Babilonia as Clara and Randy Gardner as the Nutcracker/ Prince, was released straight-to-video in 1998, appearing on DVD in 2007.
- Another edition of Nutcracker on Ice, also only an hour in length, was made in 1996 and was telecast in some areas in December 2009. Debi Thomas appears as the Snow Queen, Calla Urbanski is Clara, Rocky Marval is the Nutcracker/ Prince, and Rudy Galindo is Drosselmeyer. Music from other works by Tchaikovsky is added, and many of the divertissement dances are cut.

=== Satirical versions ===
- One satirical version involves a group of gay boys constructing a show involving the "nut cracker". The stage version involves a chorus of singing parts and various out-of-character renditions of "fairies" and "dancing flowers"
- In 2008, The Slutcracker made its debut at the Somerville Theatre in Somerville, MA. The ballet, a satirical burlesque version of the classic, produced, choreographed and directed by Vanessa White (A.K.A. Sugar Dish) featured Boston-area actors, burlesque and can-can dancers, drag kings, hoopers, ballerinas, acrobats, and bellydancers. The plot recasts Clara as an adult, the "slutcracker" as an adult toy, and the rat king antagonist as her jealous boyfriend. Because of the show's sell-out popularity it has been booked at the same venue for extended performances in 2009, 2010, and for a limited run at the Théâtre Saint-Denis in Montréal.
