= The Slutcracker =

- A Holiday Burlesque
- Holiday burlesque performance
- Music: Pyotr Ilyich Tchaikovsky
- Book: Vanessa White
- Productions: 2008-2019 Somerville Theatre; 2010 Montreal

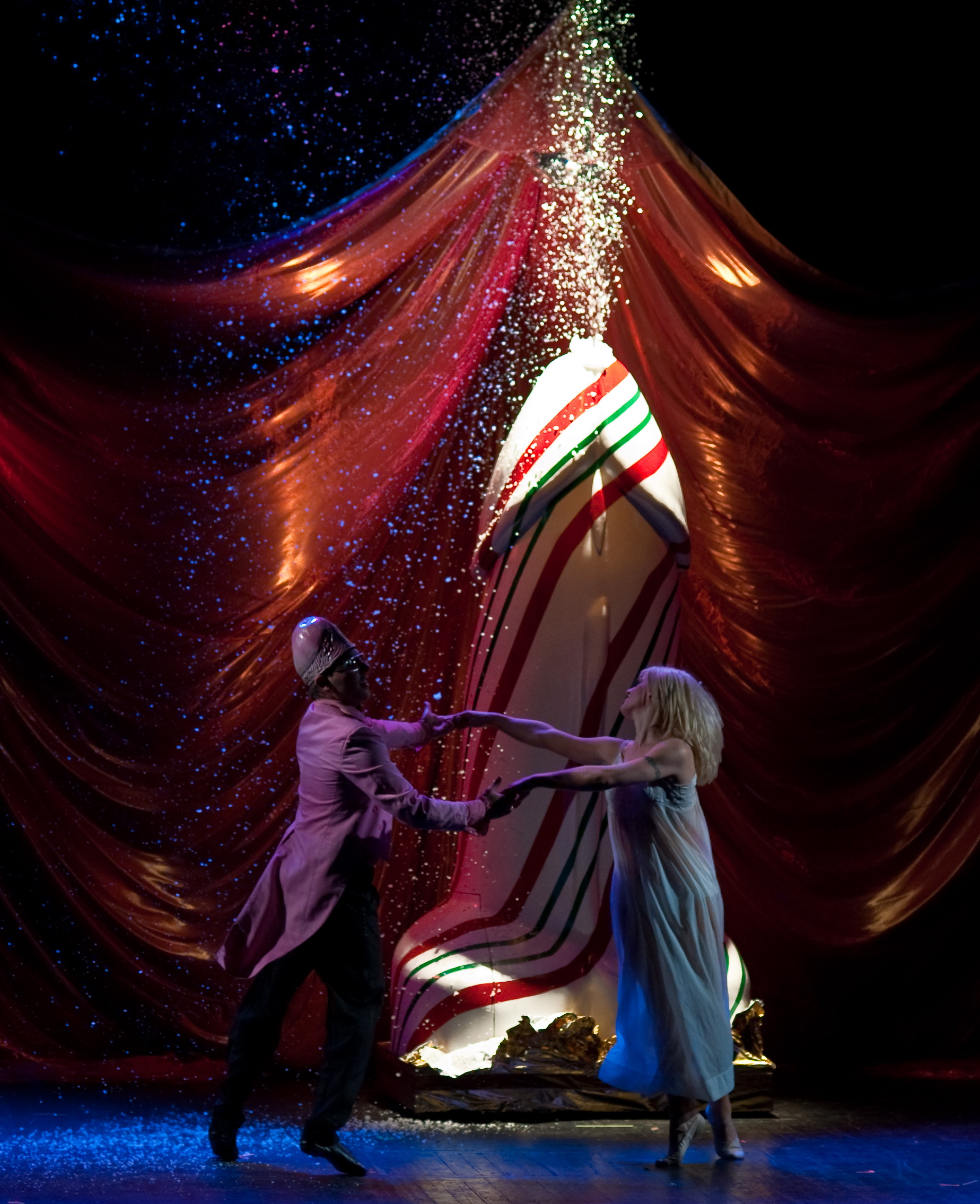
Amy snowing in the 2009 production of The Slutcracker

The Slutcracker is a burlesque, satirical version of the 1892 ballet The Nutcracker that is the creation of Lipstick Criminals troupe director Vanessa White. It has been performed in Somerville, Massachusetts, and Montreal, Quebec, Canada. The performance incorporates burlesque and tango dancers, drag kings, hoopers, ballerinas, acrobats, and belly dancers in a retelling of Pyotr Ilyich Tchaikovsky's ballet from the point of view of a young woman who experiences a sexual awakening during a holiday dream-like sequence.

== Plot ==
The story takes place on Christmas Eve when gifts are exchanged between a newly engaged adult couple (Clara and Fritz) and a friend (Drosselmeyer). Unlike Tchaikovsky's original story where a godfather gives his niece a "nutcracker doll" as a gift, this friend chooses to give Clara a vibrator to allow sexual self stimulation. After Clara is embarrassed by the new gift and Fritz feels threatened by it after unsuccessful intercourse, Fritz tries to damage the vibrator. The vibrator repairs itself and, through adamant and persistent action, is able to win Clara over. A battle then ensues in Clara's imagination between her staid, sexually repressed friends and forces including such entities as batteries, bunnies, and hoopers who are all led by the anthropomorphized vibrator, now known as the Slutcracker. After winning the battle, the Slutcracker transforms himself into a type of Prince who takes Clara to a realm of sexual fantasy where repressed desires can be lived out. There she encounters people and things such as dancers who disrobe each other, a bondage dominatrix, pole dancers, Amy (a candy cane dildo which shoots artificial snow), topless fan dancers, synchronized swimmers who engage in a type of orgy and a fairy who performs a striptease.

== Roles in relation to Nutcracker counterparts ==
The following is a list of roles for the performance:

=== Act I ===
Clara- Nutcracker counterpart: Clara Protagonist. A twentysomething female trapped in suburban doldrums, but oblivious to her entrapment until Drosselmeyer gives her a vibrator, which becomes the Slutcracker Prince, who shows Clara a sexual spectrum.

Fritz- Nutcracker counterpart: Rat King Antagonist. A twenty-something male also trapped in suburban doldrums, and also oblivious to this fact. Proposes marriage to Clara (which she accepts), but then breaks the engagement when the vibrator arrives on the scene. Fritz battles the Slutcracker Prince for her affection, and loses. Fritz returns later to try to win Clara back, and does after learning to accept sexual variety.

Drosselmeyer- Nutcracker counterpart: Drosselmeyer Hero Assist. Drosselmeyer is the giver of the "slutcracker," represented as a pink vibrator. This initially embarrasses Clara, and humiliates/infuriates Fritz, who feels threatened by it. Drosselmeyer pursues and prevails in bestowing the gift, which ultimately grows up to be the Vibrator Prince.

Slutcracker Prince- Nutcracker counterpart: Nutcracker Prince Hero. Anthropomorphized Vibrator. Battles suburban doldrums and wins. Has sex with Clara, giving her her first real orgasm, thereby showing her the "light." He then brings her to the land of Sexual Fantasy (ACT II)

Party Goers- Nutcracker counterpart: Party Goers (Parents, Grandparents, children) These are Clara and Fritz's friends, all presumably straight, vanilla, suburban couples who attend their Xmas party. Each couple will have its own idiosyncrasies and subplots which will play out beginning with the opening vignettes and continuing through the Battle Scene, when they don "bad" X-mas sweaters and assist Fritz in battling the Slutcracker Prince. NOTE: Not all party goers will participate in the Battle Scene, analogous to the battle between mice and gingerbread soldiers in the original Nutcracker.

Team Bad Xmas Sweater- Nutcracker Counterpart: Mice/Rats The Party Goers who participate in the Battle Scene

Batteries- Nutcracker Counterpart: Tin Soldiers The batteries quite literally power the Slutcracker Prince and help him to defeat Team Bad Xmas Sweaters.

Slutcracker Bunny- Nutcracker counterpart: Bunny The Slutcracker Bunny, much like the Energizer Bunny, beats a drum and assists the Batteries.

Orgasm Hoopers- Nutcracker counterpart: Snowflakes Illuminated hoop dancers who represent Clara's orgasm (big, spinning, blinking, Os), which ends ACT I

=== Act II ===
Bacchanalia- Nutcracker Counterpart: Angels There are TWO COMPONENTS to Bacchanalia, which are called CORPS and FLUFFERS. CORPS are the dancers on stage. FLUFFERS are the dancers flitting about in the audience. The Bacchanalia Corps (lovingly called Baklava backstage) serves as the welcoming committee for Clara and Slutcracker. They welcome her to the land of sexual fantasy where she is invited to be sexy, free, indulged, and entertained. The fluffers will welcome the audience, flitting about, sprinkling rose petals, giving lapdances, high fives, fist bumps, kisses, etc.

Tango- Nutcracker Counterpart: Spanish/Chocolate These are an ambi-sexual tango partner dancers, wherein the dancers change partners frequently while disrobing one another.

Arabian- Nutcracker Counterpart: Arabian/Coffee Veiled, blindfolded, lesbian-bondage bellydancers.

Chinese- Nutcracker Counterpart: Chinese/Tea Traditional Chinese fandancers, except topless.

Russian- Nutcracker Counterpart: Russian/Trépak A trio of black PVC-clad dominatrixes number en pointe, with bull whips.

Gimp- Nutcracker Counterpart: None A clever device used to set up the stripper pole.

Dance of the Reed Pole- Nutcracker Counterpart: Dance of the Reed Pipes A solo pole dance privately entertaining Clara and Slutcracker

Polichinelle- Nutcracker counterpart: Polichinelle An orgy of sexually ambiguous clowns. They all have imaginable sex organs, plus long, phallic noses.

Waltz of the Flowers & Wet Spot Fairy- Nutcracker counterpart: Waltz of the Flowers and Dew Drop Fairy Six "Petals" encircle the centerpiece, the Wet Spot Fairy. This number is choreographed not unlike a 1960s synchronized swimming number or a geometric Busby Berkeley number (who actually directed at the Somerville Theatre in the 1920s). The costume is very intricate, as the Flower Petals' costumes all physically connect to the Wet Spot Fairy's costume, and all get plucked.

Sugar Dish Fairy- Nutcracker counterpart: Sugar Plum Fairy This character performs a solo striptease en pointe, in a tutu. She performs the closing number before the finale.

== Reception ==
The show began its initial holiday run in December 2008 at the prestigious Somerville Theatre in Greater Boston. The popularity of the show exceeded initial expectations as it sold out its first four shows in the 900-seat theatre. Two more shows were subsequently added. In the show's 2009 run, the number of performances were doubled from the previous year. Since the show's initial 2008 run, it has returned to the Somerville Theatre each December for successively longer runs and has expanded its tour to include post-holiday performances during January in Montreal's theatre district. The 2010 tour included 16 shows in Boston and 2 in Montreal.

== Controversy ==
The Slutcracker's overt portrayal of sexual themes created some antagonistic responses from groups such as MassResistance, a conservative Christian group. Specifically the group expressed concern about the positive portrayal of homoeroticism, BDSM, promiscuity, and strippers as well as the inclusion of props such as the snow-shooting candy cane dildo featured prominently throughout the performance to suggest male orgasm.

== See also ==
List of productions of The Nutcracker
