= Lew Christensen =

American ballet dancer and choreographer (1909–1984)

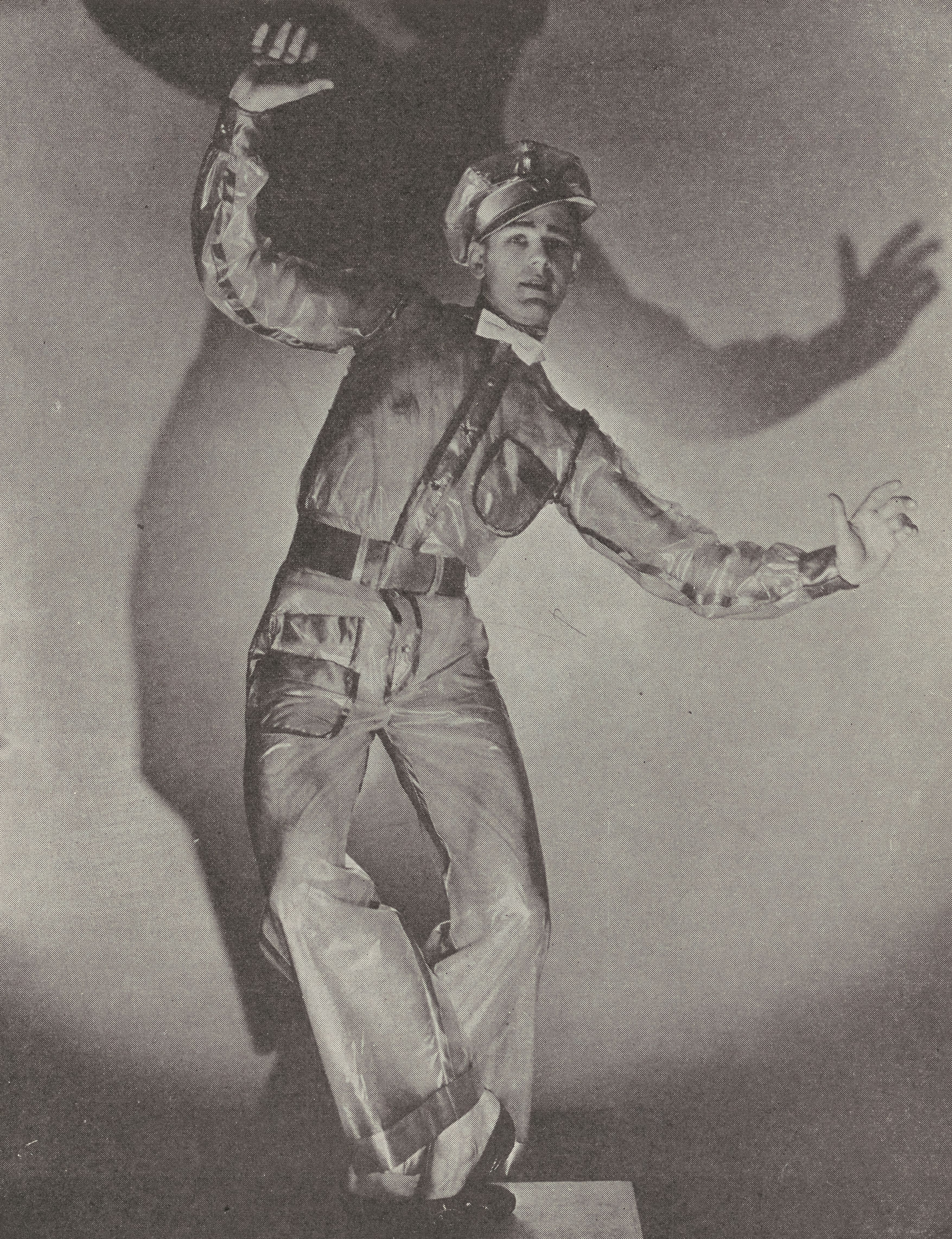
- Christensen in 1938
- Born: Lewellyn Farr Christensen; May 6, 1909; Brigham City, Utah, U.S.
- Died: October 9, 1984 (aged 75); Burlingame, California, U.S.
- Occupations: Ballet dancer, choreographer, company director
- Spouse: Gisella Caccialanza (m. 1941)
- Children: 1

Lewellyn Farr "Lew" Christensen (May 6, 1909 – October 9, 1984) was a ballet dancer, choreographer and director for many companies. He was largely associated with George Balanchine and the San Francisco Ballet, which he directed from 1952–1984. Other companies Christensen was a part of include Ballet Caravan, directed by Lincoln Kirstein, and Ballet Society, directed by Kirstein and Balanchine.

== Early life and training ==
Christensen was born in Brigham City, Utah, to a family with roots in dance and music. His grandfather, Lars Christensen, who emigrated from Denmark, taught folk and social dances. Christensen was raised a Mormon, and this upbringing informed his latter career with of a sense of focusing on propriety.

Christensen began studying dance with his uncles and music with his father when he was ten. He was taught early ballet technique by Stefano Mascagno, an Italian teacher. His brother Willam started Lew and their third dancing brother, Harold, in vaudeville. In addition to small vaudeville shows, the three brothers landed jobs in the Broadway musical The Great Waltz, during which time Christensen became a student at Balanchine's new School of American Ballet. In 1935, he joined the Metropolitan Opera's American Ballet Ensemble with Harold.

== Dancing with Balanchine and Army service ==
As soon as Christensen began his training, he received special attention from George Balanchine, who recognized his talent. Among Balanchine's first lead male dancers, Christensen danced principal roles, receiving much praise for his lead roles in Orpheus and Eurydice and Apollon Musagète. Christensen, the first American to dance Apollo, set a new standard for that role, and was thereafter considered to be America's first home grown significant male dancer.

At the onset of World War II, Lew Christensen was drafted into the United States Army. On return to New York in 1946 he joined Balanchine's and Kirstein's latest project, Ballet Society – later to be known as the New York City Ballet – where he became a ballet master. Although considered by many to be the logical heir to Balanchine's company, Christensen was instead enticed to join his brothers at the San Francisco Ballet in 1948.

== Ballet Caravan ==
Ballet Caravan, begun in 1936 by Kirstein, was intended to provide American ballet dancers with summer employment during off-seasons. As a member, Christensen was a lead soloist, choreographer, and ballet master until 1940.

Between 1936 and 1941 ballets Christensen choreographed included Pocahontas (1936), Filling Station (1938), Charade (1939), and Pastorela (1941). Filling Station incorporated Christensen's vaudeville roots, acrobats, deadpan humor, and tap dancing.

With Ballet Caravan, Christensen and his wife Gisella Caccialanza toured South America in 1941.

== San Francisco Ballet ==
Christensen served as associate director of the San Francisco Ballet in 1949, and was co-director in 1951 with his brother Willam. He served as director from 1952–1984.

Christensen transformed the San Francisco Ballet to an internationally recognized neoclassical company. Although he joined the San Francisco Ballet in 1949, Christensen continued to act as ballet master for the New York City Ballet until 1950. After becoming co-director of the San Francisco company in 1951, he kept a good relationship between it and the New York City Ballet. In 1952, on his brother Willam's departure to establish the ballet program at the University of Utah, Lew became the director of the company. He choreographed over 110 works for the San Francisco Ballet. He brought impressive choreography from Balanchine to the company. With Christensen as director, San Francisco Ballet made its first tours nationally and internationally and received much acclaim.

== Personal life ==
Christensen married ballet dancer Gisella Caccialanza in 1940 or 1941. They had one child, Chris (born 1953).

Christensen died on October 9, 1984 at Peninsula Hospital in Burlingame, California, after suffering an apparent heart attack.
