= Vasili Vainonen =

Ingrian Soviet choreographer

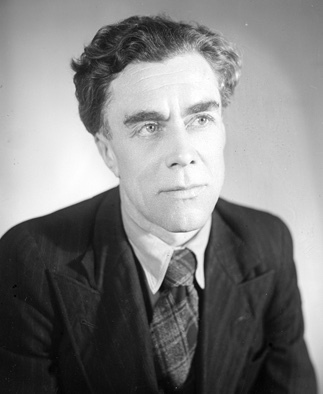
- Vainonen c. 1947
- Born: February 21, 1901; Saint Petersburg
- Died: March 23, 1964 (aged 63); Moscow
- Citizenship: Russian, Soviet

Vasili Ivanovich Vainonen, also spelled Vasily (Russian: Васи́лий Ива́нович Вайно́нен) (1901–1964), was a Russian choreographer, mainly for the Kirov Ballet, now known as the Mariinsky Ballet, with which he worked from 1930 to 1938.

At 19 years old, he began choreographing works, mostly for smaller concert stages and, quickly, made a name for himself. His initial career at the Kirov was somewhat shaky after he choreographed one of the acts (together with V.P. Chesnakov and Leonid Yakobson) Shostakovich's ballet The Golden Age. Vainonen's section was partly censored due to its use of western dance styles and the ballet was shelved after its initial run.

Of all the Vainonen works from this period, the one still performed is Flames of Paris (Russian: Пла́мя Пари́жа) from 1932 with music by Boris Asafyev partly incorporating the melodies of songs of the French Revolution. The libretto by Nicolai Volkov and Vladimir Dmitriev was adapted from a book by Felix Gras. It was premiered at the Kirov Theatre in Leningrad on 7 November 1932, with Natalia Dudinskaya as Mireille de Poitiers, Vakhtang Chabukiani as Jérôme, Olga Jordan as Jeanne, Nina Anisimova as Thérèse, and Konstantin Sergeyev as Mistral. The ballet created an analogy between the French and Russian revolutions and is considered a prime example of "Soviet heroic dramballet." It premiered at the Bolshoi a year later in slightly revised form with Vakhtang Chabukiani and later Aleksey Yermolayev starring as Jerome.

Perhaps his other most celebrated production was his 1934 version of Tchaikovsky's The Nutcracker, a production which was successfully revived in 1954, is available on DVD in a 1994 revival, and remains in the repertory of the company to this day. Other choreographers of the beloved Christmas ballet, such as Mikhail Baryshnikov and Yuri Grigorovich, have freely borrowed several ideas supposedly from the Vainonen Nutcracker for their own productions. (Vainonen is often erroneously credited with being the first choreographer to cast adults rather than children in the roles of Clara and the Nutcracker/ Prince, thereby introducing a love interest into the plot which was not present in the original production.)

However, Baryshnikov, in his production of The Nutcracker did borrow Vainonen's choreography for the "Snowflake Waltz", and gave him credit for it in the billing. He also included, like Vainonen, a puppet show staged by Drosselmeyer during the Christmas Party scene. The puppet show foreshadows the later fantasy scenes by having a Prince, a Princess, and a Mouse King as characters.

He later did new versions of the classical ballets: Raymonda (1938, Kirov Theatre), Harlequinade (1945, Minsk Theatre), The Sleeping Beauty (1952, Novosibirsk Theatre). His other ballets: Vasilenko's Mirandolina (1949, Bolshoi Theatre; 1965, Navoy Theatre, Tashkent), Gayane (1957, Bolshoi Theatre), dances in Smetana's opera The Bartered Bride (1948, Bolshoi Theatre). He also wrote the libretto (together with Pavel Malyarevsky) for Shchedrin's The Little Humpbacked Horse (1960, Bolshoi Theatre) and choreographed dances in operas and concert numbers.

In 1951–1953 he headed the ballet troupe of the Novosibirsk Opera and Ballet Theater. He was awarded a Stalin Prize of the first degree (1947) – for the ballet Flames of Paris. He was married to Claudia Armashevskoy. V. I. Vaynonen died on March 23, 1964. He was buried in Moscow at Novodevichy Cemetery.
