= Gisella Caccialanza =

American ballerina (1914–1998)

- Born: September 17, 1914; San Diego, California, United States
- Died: July 16, 1998 (aged 83); Daly City, California, United States
- Occupation: ballerina
- Years active: 1928–1953
- Spouse: Lew Christensen (m. 1941; died 1984)
- Children: 1
- Career
- Dances: ballet

Gisella Caccialanza (September 17, 1914 – July 16, 1998) was an American prima ballerina and teacher who danced in theater, opera and film productions. She studied ballet under Italian teacher Giovanni Rosi, and then with the great ballet teacher Enrico Cecchetti at La Scala in Milan, Italy. Caccialanza danced with Viennese choreographer Albertina Rasch, the School of American Ballet, the New Opera Company, and the San Francisco Ballet, with which she later taught and coached.

== Biography ==
Caccialanza was born to Italian American parents in San Diego on September 17, 1914. She studied ballet under the tutelage of Italian teacher Giovanni Rosi, who recommended that she venture to Milan, Italy and continue her studies there. In 1925, Caccialanza was taken to La Scala to receive advanced training in ballet. During her three-year studying period at the opera house, she won a bronze, silver and gold medal during her final examinations at the end of the year. Caccialanza earned the awareness of the great ballet teacher Enrico Cecchetti, and he spent his final years improving her ability; he made her his goddaughter at her confirmation ceremony, after he was granted permission for it by the Pope.

In 1928, Caccialanza returned to the United States. She was encouraged by Cecchetti to follow his routines, rather than certain American teachers whom he considered incompetent. Caccialanza worked with Viennese choreographer in ballet, musicals and vaudeville Albertina Rasch, on a three-year contract. She toured the United States in Rasch's dance troupes. This included performances in vaudeville houses, in motion picture prologues, the Grauman's Chinese Theatre and Radio City Music Hall. Caccialanza performed five times a day at Radio City Music Hall, and ballet dancer Serge Lifar persuaded her to audition for a new school run by George Balanchine.

She immediately earned a scholarship to the School of American Ballet, and impressed the faculty with the training she had received from Cecchetti. Caccialanza became a charter member of the company in 1934, and performed in the major cities of the United States. She performed under Balanchine in the ballets Serenade in 1934, Le baiser de la fée in 1937, the second ballerina in the premiere of Ballet Imperial in 1941 under the employ of the New Opera Company, the lead dancer in the full-length American premiere of The Nutcracker with the San Francisco Ballet at the San Francisco Opera House in 1944, and The Four Temperaments in 1946. Caccialanza also danced in the musical films The Goldwyn Follies in 1938, and On Your Toes the following year with choreography undertaken by Balanchine. When the ballet did not perform, she appeared with the touring group Ballet Caravan, and danced in the premieres of Harlequin for President, Promenade, and The Soldier and the Gypsy in 1936, and at Los Angeles' Philharmonic Auditorium.

In 1941, the American Ballet and Ballet Caravan had worked together in a tour of Latin America, and Caccialanza danced a pas de deux at the New York headquarters of the United Service Organizations, and spoke at a rally to encourage scrap metal collecting. She was offered a role of Laurey in Oklahoma! for the Theatre Guild's road company in New Haven in October 1943, which she turned down to honor a prior partnership. Caccialanza later joined the Ballet Society, and danced with the San Francisco Ballet until the birth of her son in 1953. She later taught and coached at the school. A collection of Caccialanza's correspondence with Cecchetti was published as Letters From the Maestro in 1971.

== Personal life ==
She was married to American choreographer Lew Christensen from 1941 until his death in 1984. Their son Chris went on to be a conductor.

Caccialanza died at Seton Medical Center, Daly City on July 16, 1998, after a series of strokes.

== Legacy ==
Variety magazine called her "a premier ballerina of the 1930s", and The New York Times referred to her as "a major American ballerina". The Dance, Music, Recorded Sound, and Theatre Divisions of the New York Public Library holds a collection of letters and manuscripts relating to her life from 1926 to 1972.
