= Ruslan Skvortsov =

Russian dancer (born 1980)

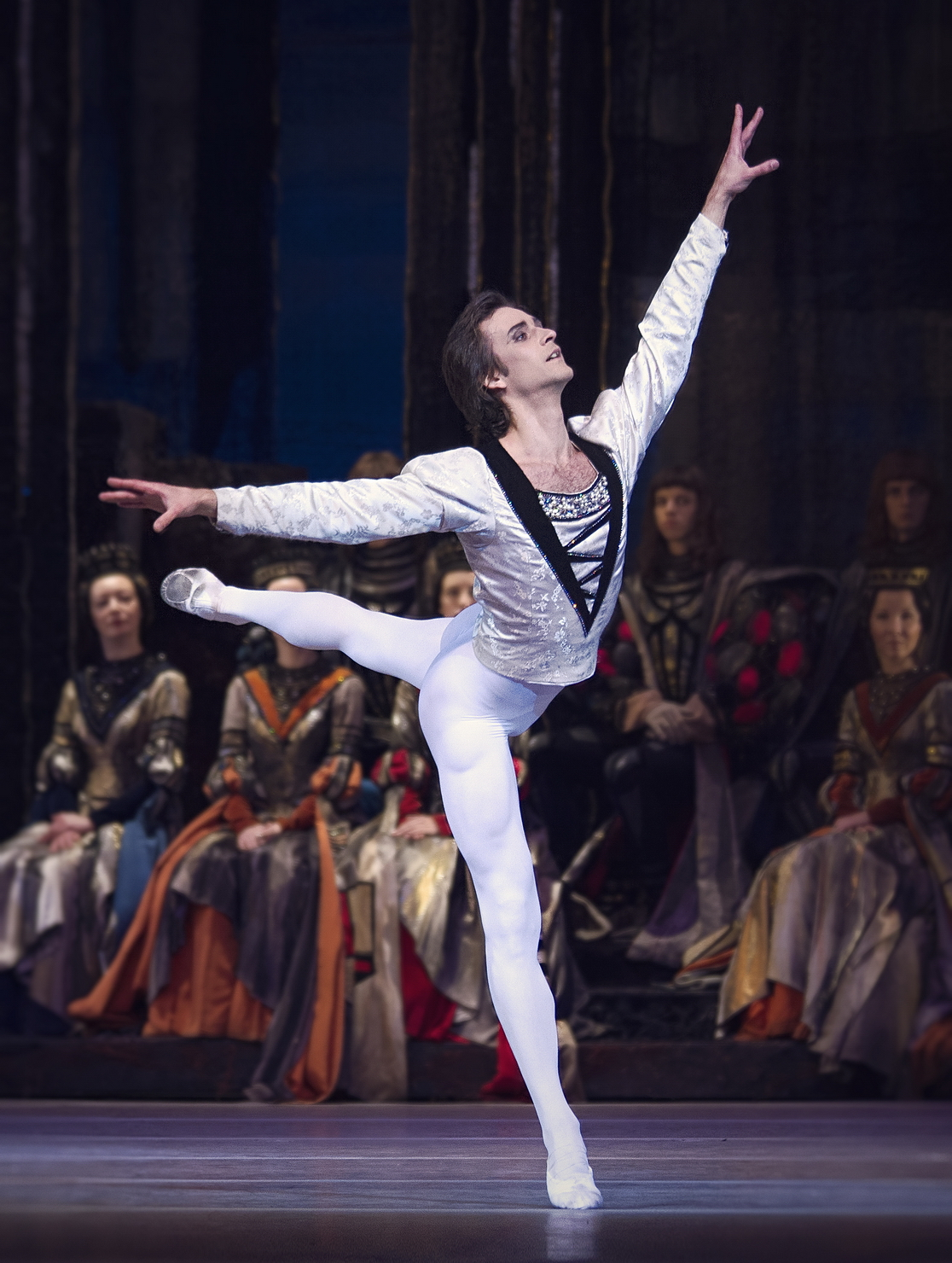
- Ruslan Skvortsov as Prince Siegfried in Swan Lake. Bolshoi Theatre. 2011
- Born: Ruslan Vasilyevich Skvortsov; 31 January 1980 (age 46); Yelets, USSR (now Russia)
- Citizenship: Russian Federation
- Education: Moscow Choreographic Academy
- Occupation: Ballet dancer
- Years active: 1998 to present
- Employer(s): Bolshoi Theatre; Kremlin Ballet
- Height: 183 cm (6 ft 0 in)
- Awards: Meritorious Artist of Russia (2014)

Ruslan Vasilyevich Skvortsov (Russian: Руслан Васильевич Скворцов; born 31 January 1980) is a Russian principal dancer of the Bolshoi Ballet.

== Biography ==
Ruslan Skvortsov was born in Yelets, Lipetsk Oblast, where he received his early training from Elena Timofeyeva, and then studied at the Moscow Choreographic Academy with Vyacheslav Mikhaylov. Upon his graduation in 1998 he joined the Bolshoi Ballet, where he has worked under the tutelage of Valery Lagunov and Nikolai Fadeyechev. In 2001 he was awarded a bronze medal at the Moscow International Ballet Competition. He was appointed to the rank of principal dancer in October 2009 and was awarded the title of Meritorious Artist of Russia in April 2014.

Skvortsov made his debut as the soloist of the Fourth Movement of George Balanchine's Symphony in C in 1999 and danced his first leading role in an evening-length ballet, Little Count Cherry in Cipollino, in 2000, followed by the Poet in Michel Fokine's Chopiniana in 2001. He first danced Prince Siegfried in Swan Lake in 2002, followed by debuts as Count Albrecht in Giselle, Lord Wilson/Ta-Hor in The Pharaoh's Daughter, Claude Frollo in Roland Petit's Notre-Dame de Paris and the Ballet Dancer in Alexei Ratmansky's The Bright Stream in 2003. In 2004 Skvortsov first danced Jean de Brienne in Raymonda and Balanchine's Agon, and in 2005 he performed the Miller in Léonide Massine's The Three-Cornered Hat, the Hero in Massine's Les Présages and Demetrius in John Neumeier's A Midsummer Night's Dream. Further debuts followed as Boris in Yuri Grigorovich's The Golden Age (2006), Don José in Carmen Suite (2007), James in La Sylphide (2008), Prince Désiré in The Sleeping Beauty (2008), Conrad in Le Corsaire (2009), Romeo in Grigorovich's production of Romeo and Juliet (2010), the title role in John Cranko's Onegin (2013) and Des Grieux in Neumeier's The Lady of the Camellias (2014). At the Bolshoi Ballet he was the first to perform the roles of Antoine Mistral in Ratmansky's Flames of Paris (2008), Lucien d'Hervilly in Yuri Burlaka's staging of the grand pas from Paquita (2008), Frantz in Sergei Vikharev's reconstruction of Coppélia (2009), Phoebus in Esmeralda (2009), staged by Burlaka and Vasily Medvedev, and My Father, My Hero in Maurice Béjart's Gaîté Parisienne (2019). In 2015 he danced the part of Pechorin ("Princess Mary" section) in the world premiere of Yuri Possokhov's A Hero of Our Time, and in 2021 he performed the role of Sorin in the world premiere of Possokhov's The Seagull. In 2019 he made his debut as Crassus in Grigorovich's Spartacus, and in 2022 he made his debut as Drosselmeyer in Grigorovich's The Nutcracker.

With the Bolshoi Ballet Skvortsov has performed in the United States, Canada, Mexico, Cuba, the United Kingdom, France, the Netherlands, Belgium, Switzerland, Italy, Norway, Japan, South Korea, China, Singapore, the United Arab Emirates, Turkey, South Africa and Australia. His guest appearances have included performing Swan Lake at the Mariinsky Theatre in Saint Petersburg, Giselle at the Teatro di San Carlo in Naples and Asuka at the New National Theatre Tokyo to mark the 60th anniversary of the Asami Maki Ballet.

In 2024 Skvortsov became a répétiteur and coach at the Kremlin Ballet.

== Repertoire ==
- La Sylphide (choreography: Johan Kobborg, after August Bournonville): James
- Giselle (choreography: Vladimir Vasiliev, after Jean Coralli and Jules Perrot): Count Albrecht
- Giselle (choreography: Yuri Grigorovich, after Jean Coralli and Jules Perrot): Count Albrecht
- Giselle (choreography: Sergei Vikharev, after Jean Coralli and Jules Perrot): Count Albrecht
- Giselle (choreography: Galina Boreyko, after Jean Coralli and Jules Perrot): Count Albrecht
- Giselle (choreography: Konstantin Sergeyev, after Jean Coralli and Jules Perrot): Count Albrecht
- Giselle (choreography: Leonid Lavrovsky, after Jean Coralli and Jules Perrot): Count Albrecht
- Giselle (choreography: Ludmila Semenyaka, after Jean Coralli and Jules Perrot): Count Albrecht
- Giselle (choreography: Kirill Shmorgomer, after Jean Coralli and Jules Perrot): Count Albrecht
- Giselle (choreography: Gamar Almaszadeh, after Jean Corali and Jules Perrot): Count Albrecht
- Coppélia (choreography: Sergei Vikharev, after Marius Petipa and Enrico Cecchetti): Frantz (first interpreter at the Bolshoi)
- Swan Lake (choreography: Yuri Grigorovich, after Marius Petipa and Lev Ivanov): Prince Siegfried
- Swan Lake (choreography: Rafael Samorukov, after Marius Petipa and Lev Ivanov): Prince Siegfried
- Swan Lake (choreography: Konstantin Sergeyev, after Marius Petipa and Lev Ivanov): Prince Siegfried
- Swan Lake (choreography: Kyozo Mitani and Terry Westmoreland, after Marius Petipa and Lev Ivanov): Prince Siegfried
- Swan Lake (choreography: Alexei Fadeyechev, after Marius Petipa and Lev Ivanov): Prince Siegfried
- The Sleeping Beauty (choreography: Yuri Grigorovich, after Marius Petipa): Prince Désiré
- Raymonda (choreography: Yuri Grigorovich, after Marius Petipa): Jean de Brienne
- La Bayadère (choreography: Yuri Grigorovich, after Marius Petipa): Solor
- Don Quixote (choreography: Alexei Fadeyechev, after Marius Petipa and Alexander Gorsky): Espada
- Le Corsaire (choreography: Yuri Burlaka and Alexei Ratmansky, after Marius Petipa): Conrad, grand pas des eventails
- Esmeralda (choreography: Yuri Burlaka and Vasily Medvedev, after Marius Petipa): Phoebus (first interpreter at the Bolshoi)
- Paquita, grand pas (choreography: Yuri Burlaka, after Marius Petipa): Lucien d’Hervilly (first interpreter at the Bolshoi)
- The Pharaoh's Daughter (choreography: Pierre Lacotte): Lord Wilson/Ta-Hor
- The Nutcracker (choreography: Vasily Vainonen): Nutcracker Prince
- The Nutcracker (choreography: Yuri Grigorovich): Nutcracker Prince, Drosselmeyer
- Spartacus (choreography: Yuri Grigorovich): Crassus
- Romeo and Juliet (choreography: Yuri Grigorovich): Romeo
- The Golden Age (choreography: Yuri Grigorovich): Boris
- Notre-Dame de Paris (choreography: Roland Petit): Claude Frollo
- Onegin (choreography: John Cranko): Onegin
- A Midsummer Night’s Dream (choreography: John Neumeier): Demetrius
- The Lady of the Camellias (choreography: John Neumeier): Des Grieux, M. Duval
- The Bright Stream (choreography: Alexei Ratmansky): Ballet Dancer
- Flames of Paris (choreography: Alexei Ratmansky, after Vasily Vainonen): Antoine Mistral (first interpreter), Marquis de Beauregard, Louis XVI
- A Hero of Our Time (choreography: Yuri Possokhov): Pechorin, in "Princess Mary" (first interpreter)
- The Seagull (choreography: Yuri Possokhov): Sorin (first interpreter)
- Asuka (choreography: Asami Maki): Iwatari
- Chopiniana (choreography: Michel Fokine): Poet
- Afternoon of a Faun (choreography: Vaslav Nijinsky): Faun
- The Three-Cornered Hat (choreography: Léonide Massine): Miller
- Les Présages (choreography: Léonide Massine): The Hero
- Carmen Suite (choreography: Alberto Alonso): Don José
- Gaîté Parisienne (choreography: Maurice Béjart): My Father, My Hero (first interpreter at the Bolshoi)
- Symphony in C (choreography: George Balanchine): Second Movement soloist, Third Movement soloist, Fourth Movement soloist
- Agon (choreography: George Balanchine): pas de deux
- Jewels (choreography: George Balanchine): "Emeralds"
- Passacaille (choreography: Roland Petit; Bolshoi premiere)
- Magrittomania (choreography: Yuri Possokhov)
- Misericordes (choreography: Christopher Wheeldon; world premiere)
- Dream of Dream (choreography: Jorma Elo; world premiere)

== Filmography ==
- Strictly Bolshoi, Bolshoi Ballet, 2007 (documentary includes a complete performance of Christopher Wheeldon's Misericordes)
- Flames of Paris (choreography: Alexei Ratmansky), Bolshoi Ballet, 2010: as Antoine Mistral, with Natalia Osipova, Ivan Vasiliev, Nina Kaptsova, Denis Savin, Anna Antonicheva and Yuri Klevtsov
- Swan Lake (choreography: Yuri Grigorovich), Bolshoi Ballet, 2010: as Prince Siegfried, with Maria Alexandrova and Nikolay Tsiskaridze
- Symphony in C (choreography: George Balanchine), Bolshoi Ballet, 2010: as the Fourth Movement soloist, with Myriam Ould-Braham
- Esmeralda (choreography: Yuri Burlaka and Vasily Medvedev), Bolshoi Ballet, 2011: as Phoebus, with Maria Alexandrova, Ekaterina Krysanova and Denis Savin
- Le Corsaire (choreography: Yuri Burlaka and Alexei Ratmansky), Bolshoi Ballet, 2012: as Conrad, with Svetlana Lunkina and Nina Kaptsova
- The Bright Stream (choreography: Alexei Ratmansky), Bolshoi Ballet, 2012: as the Ballet Dancer, with Svetlana Lunkina, Maria Alexandrova and Mikhail Lobukhin
- Raymonda (choreography: Yuri Grigorovich), Bolshoi Ballet, 2012: as Jean de Brienne, with Maria Alexandrova and Pavel Dmitrichenko
- The Pharaoh's Daughter (choreography: Pierre Lacotte), Bolshoi Ballet, 2012: as Lord Wilson/Taor, with Svetlana Zakharova, Nina Kaptsova and Denis Medvedev
- Don Quixote (choreography: Alexei Fadeyechev), Bolshoi Ballet, 2016: as Espada, with Ekaterina Krysanova, Semyon Chudin and Anna Tikhomirova
- The Golden Age (choreography: Yuri Grigorovich), Bolshoi Ballet, 2016: as Boris, with Nina Kaptsova, Mikhail Lobukhin and Ekaterina Krysanova
- A Hero of Our Time (choreography: Yuri Possokhov), Bolshoi Ballet, 2017: as Pechorin, in "Princess Mary", with Svetlana Zakharova, Kristina Kretova and Denis Savin
- The Nutcracker (choreography: Yuri Grigorovich), Bolshoi Ballet, 2024: as Drosselmeyer, with Elizaveta Kokoreva and Artem Ovcharenko
