= Artem Ovcharenko =

Russian classical ballet dancer (born 1986)

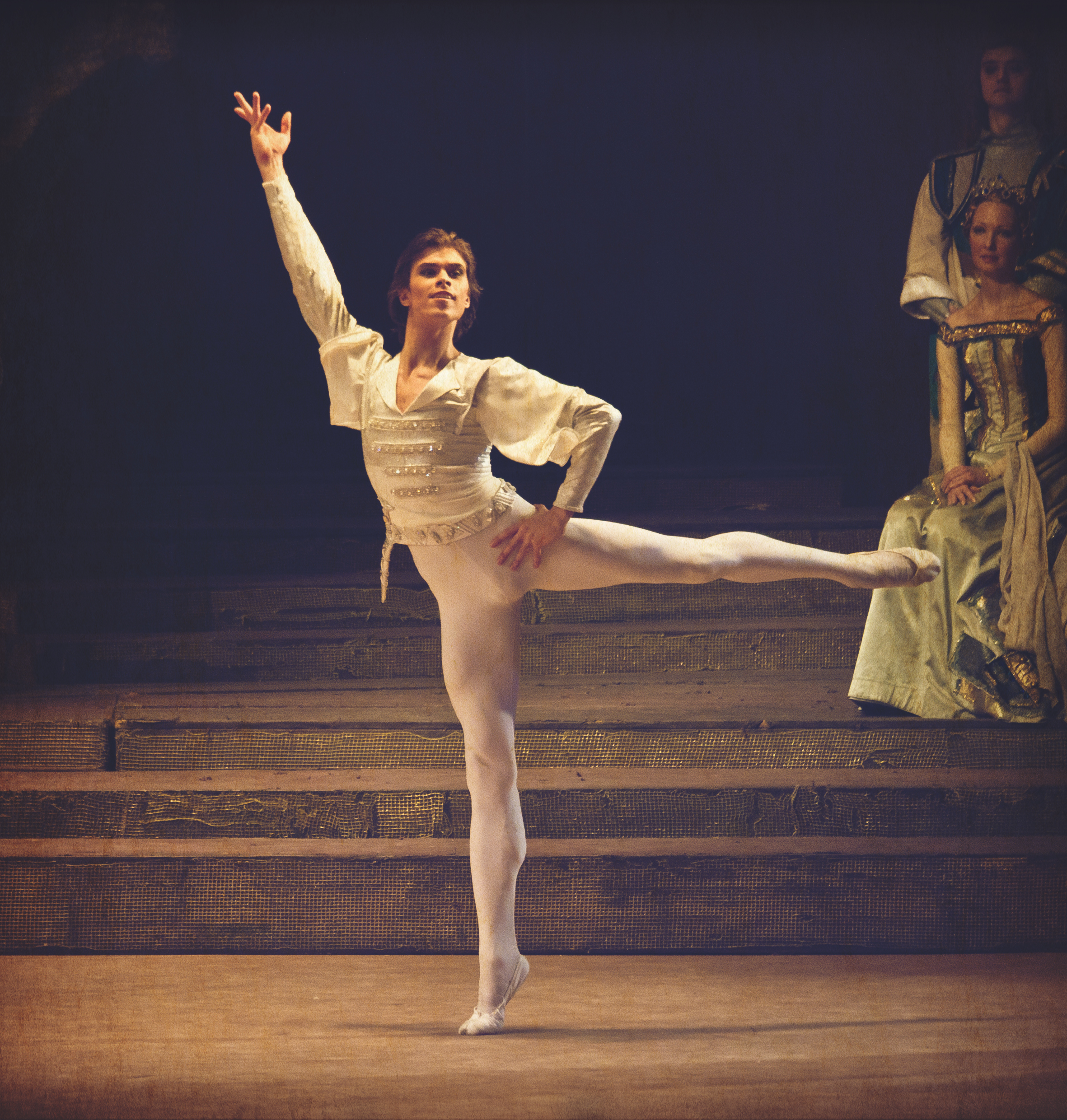
- As Jean de Brienne (Raymonda), Bolshoi, 2010
- Born: Artem Vyacheslavovich Ovcharenko; 31 December 1986 (age 39); Dnipropetrovsk, Ukrainian SSR, Soviet Union (now Ukraine)
- Citizenship: Russian Federation
- Education: Moscow Choreographic Academy
- Occupation: Ballet dancer
- Years active: 2007–present
- Employer: Bolshoi Theatre
- Height: 181 cm (5 ft 11 in)
- Website: artemovcharenko.com

Artem Vyacheslavovich Ovcharenko (Russian: Артём Вячеславович Овчаренко; born 31 December 1986) is a Russian classical ballet dancer. He is a principal dancer with the Bolshoi Ballet and a guest artist with the Hamburg Ballet.

== Life and career ==
Ovcharenko was born on 31 December 1986 in Dnipropetrovsk, Ukrainian SSR, Soviet Union. He began studying ballet at the Dnipropetrovsk State Choreographic School when he was 11 years old. At the age of 17, he entered the Bolshoi Ballet Academy where he participated in the Academy's tours to the U.S., Greece, Germany, China and other countries. He graduated in 2007 and was admitted to the Bolshoi Ballet in the corps de ballet. His mentor was Nikolay Tsiskaridze and within one year he was given the leading role in the ballet The Nutcracker. From 2009 he studied under Nikolai Fadeyechev and since 2016 his repetiteur has been Victor Barykin.

Ovcharenko's repertoire covers most of the classical romantic roles: Romeo, The Prince in The Nutcracker, and Prince Siegfried, as well as leading roles in neoclassical productions such as George Balanchine's Apollo and Jewels, Lady of the Camellias by John Neumeier, Onegin by John Cranko, Lost Illusions by Alexei Ratmansky, and Marco Spada by Pierre Lacotte. Ovcharenko has had much success in the contemporary ballets staged at the Bolshoi, such as Chroma by Wayne McGregor, Classical Symphony by Yuri Possokhov, and The Taming of the Shrew by Jean-Christophe Maillot.

Ovcharenko has participated in the Bolshoi Ballet tours to Asia, Europe and Americas, and as a guest star in international companies such as Berlin State Ballet, Les Ballets de Monte Carlo, Hamburg State Opera, and also at international ballet festivals and national culture projects.

Ovcharenko took part in some prestigious dance competitions, receiving gold at the Tanzolymp in Berlin in 2006, and another at the Arabesque competition in Perm in 2008. In 2009, he won a Special prize "To the best partner" at the International competition of ballet dancers, and was awarded with "The Rising Star" nomination. In 2010, he took part in the International Festival "World Ballet Stars" in Donetsk, Ukraine. In January 2011, he performed with Bolshoi principal, Nina Kaptsova at the 6th Prague Ballet Gala, and in August, he danced with Anna Tikhomirova, at the closing gala-concert of the 8th Congress of the World Federation of UNESCO Clubs, Centres and Associations in Hanoi. In July 2012, he and Anna Tikhomirova participated in Rossiya K's "Grand Ballet Project" (televised in December 2012), where they were awarded the Grand Prix as "Best Ballet Duo".

In 2013, Ovcharenko was promoted to the rank of Principal dancer of the Bolshoi Ballet.

== Roles ==
=== The Bolshoi Repertoire ===
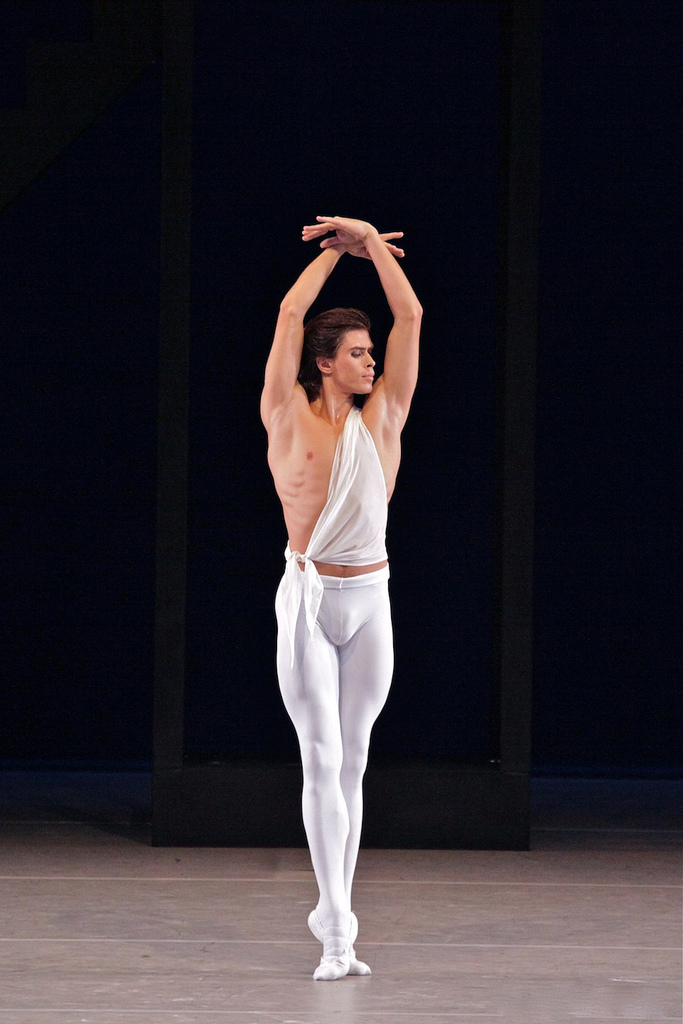
Ovcharenko as Apollo, Apollon Musagète, Bolshoi Theatre, 2012

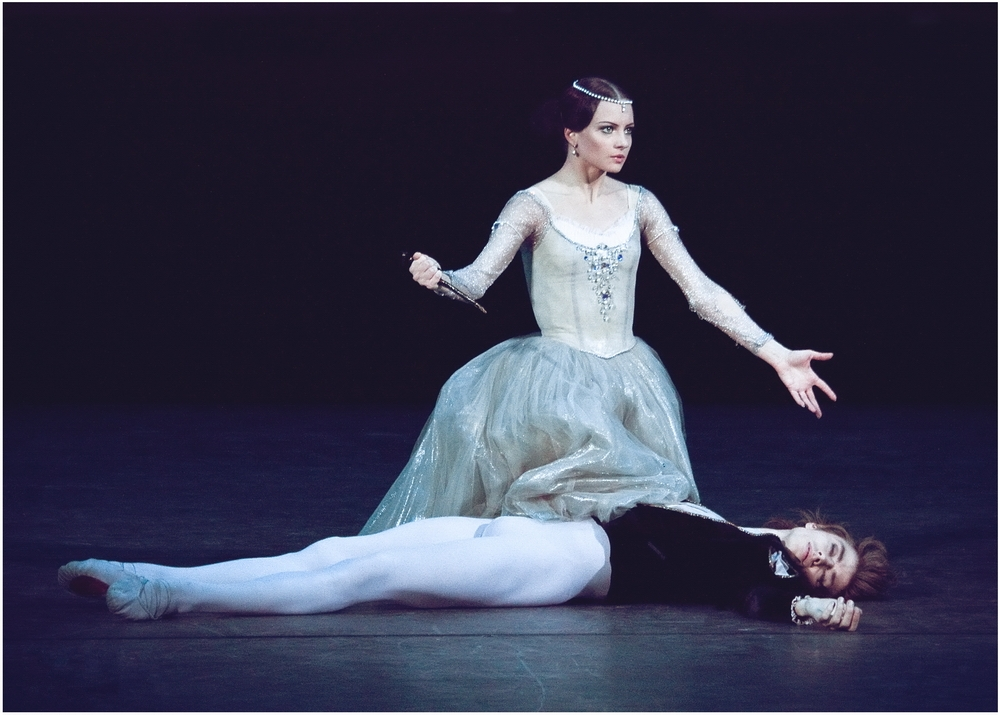
Ovcharenko as Romeo with Nina Kaptsova as Juliet, Romeo and Juliet, Bolshoi Theatre, 2010

2007

- Policeman in Cipollino, Genrih Mayorov's production
- French Doll in The Nutcracker, Yuri Grigorovich's production

2008

- Soloist in Class Concert，choreography by Asaf Messerer
- Fisherman in The Pharaoh's Daughter, Pierre Lacotte's production
- Blue Bird in The Sleeping Beauty, Yuri Grigorovich's production
- The Prince in The Nutcracker, Yuri Grigorovich's production
- Soloist of Part III in Symphony in C, George Balanchine's production

2009

- Frantz in Coppélia, revival and new version by Sergei Vikharev
- Grand Pas in Raymonda, Yuri Grigorovich's production
- James in La Sylphide, choreography by August Bournonville in a version by Johan Kobborg
- Little Count Cherry in Cipollino, Genrih Mayorov's production
- Albert (friend to Phoebus, creator of the role at the Bolshoi Theatre) and Phoebus in La Esmeralda, choreography by M. Petipa, production and new choreographic version by Yuri Burlaka and Vasily Medvedev

2010

- Romeo in Romeo and Juliet, Yuri Grigorovich's production
- Petrouchka in Petroushka, choreography by Michail Fokin, staging and new choreographic version by Sergei Vikharev
- Jean de Brienne in Raymonda, Yuri Grigorovich's production
- Lord Wilson-Taor in The Pharaoh's Daughter, Pierre Lacotte's production – debut during the Bolshoi Ballet Tour to Beijing

2011

- Count Albrecht in Giselle, Yuri Grigorovich's production – debut on 22 January 2011
- Antoine Mistral in Flames of Paris, choreography by Alexei Ratmansky with use of the original choreography by Vasily Vainonen – debut on 26 March 2011
- The First Dancer, Youth, and Robber's Leader in "Lost Illusions", Alexei Ratmansky's production – creator of the role (24 April 2011)
- Chroma, Wayne McGregor's production – appeared in the opening night performance in the Bolshoi Theater (21 July 2011)
- Symphony of Psalms, Jiri Kylian's production – appeared in the opening night performance in the Bolshoi Theater (21 July 2011)
- Blue Bird in The Sleeping Beauty, new version by Yuri Grigorovich – creation at the main stage of the Bolshoi Theatre (18 November 2011)
- Prince Désiré in The Sleeping Beauty, new version by Yuri Grigorovich – debut on 25 November 2011

2012

- Student in Anyuta, Vladimir Vasiliev's production – debut on 1 February 2012
- Siegfried in Swan Lake Yuri Grigorovich's production – debut on 18 February 2012
- Soloist of Grand Pas des Eventeils in Le Corsaire, choreography by Marius Petipa, production and new choreography by Alexei Ratmansky and Yuri Burlaka
- Two couples in Classical Symphony, Yuri Possokhov's production – appeared in the opening night performance in the Bolshoi Theater (29 June 2012)
- Duet in Dream of Dream, Jorma Elo's production – appeared in the opening night performance in the Bolshoi Theater (29 June 2012)
- Apollo in George Balanchine's Apollo – debut on 5 October 2012
- Prince Kurbsky in Ivan the Terrible, Yuri Grigorovich's production – creator of the role in the new version (8 November 2012)
- Piggy-Wiggy in Moidodyr (Wash'em Clean), Yuri Smekalov's production – debut on 22 December 2012

2013

- Leading couple in George Balanchine's Diamonds – debut on 6 March 2013
- Lensky in John Cranko's Onegin – debut on 14 July 2013
- Marco Spada in Marco Spada, Pierre Lacotte's production – debut on 9 November 2013

2014

- Armand Duval in Lady of the Camellias, John Neumeier's production – debut on 20 March 2014
- Lucentio in The Taming of the Shrew, Jean-Christophe Maillot's production – debut on 5 July 2014

2015

- Leading couple in Classical Symphony, Yuri Possokhov's production
- Hamlet in Hamlet, choreography by Radu Paklitaru – debut on 13 March 2015
- Pechorin in A Hero of Our Time (Part 2 "Taman"), choreography by Yuri Possokhov – creator of the role (22 July 2015)

2016

- Basilio in Don Quixote, Alexei Fadeyechev's production – debut on 6 February 2016

2017

- Principal Dancer in Etudes, Harold Lander's production – debut on 19 March 2017
- Leading dancer in George Balanchine's Rubies – debut on 1 April 2017
- Conrad in Le Corsaire, choreography by Marius Petipa, production and new choreography by Alexei Ratmansky and Yuri Burlaka – debut on 20 October 2016
- Nureyev in Nureyev, choreography by Yuri Possokhov, designed and directed by Kirill Serebrennikov – debut on 10 December 2017

2018

- Vronsky in Anna Karenina, John Neumeier's production – debut on 24 March 2018
- Konstantin (Kostya) in The Seagull, John Neumeier's production – debut on 29 April 2018 at the Hamburg Opera (partner — Alina Cojocaru as Nina Zarechnaya)
- Petrushka in Petrushka, Edward Clug's production – debut on 21 November 2018

2019

- Leontes in The Winter's Tale, Christopher Wheeldon's production – debut on 5 April 2019
- Leading Soloist of Part I in Symphony in C, George Balanchine's production – debut on 13 June 2019
- Crassus in Spartacus, Yury Grigorovich's production – debut on 26 June 2019 during the Bolshoi Ballet Tour to Brisbane
- Count Albrecht in Giselle, Alexei Ratmansky's production — debut on 22 November 2019

2021

- Konstantin Treplev in The Seagull, Yuri Possokhov's production – debut on 1 July 2021
- Master in Master and Margarita, Edward Clug's production – debut on 2 December 2021

2022

- Summer in Les Saisons, Artemy Belyakov's production – debut on 7 July 2022
- Youth in Les Sylphides, choreography by Mikhail Fokine – debut on 30 November
- Lucien d’Hervilly in Grand Pas from Paquita, choreography by Marius Petipa in Yuri Burlaka’s version – debut on 2 December 2022

2023

- Tomsky in The Queen of Spades, Yuri Possokhov's production – debut on 14 December 2023

2024

- Romeo in Romeo and Juliet, Leonid Lavrovsky's production — debut on 5 April 2024

2025

- Ballet Dancer in The Bright Stream, Alexei Ratmansky's production — debut on 14 March 2025
- Ivan in The Little Humpbacked Horse, Maxim Petrov's production — debut on 29 May 2025
- Petrouchka in Petrouchka, choreography by Michel Fokine, production and new choreography by Andris Liepa — debut on 12 July 2025
- The Marquis Costa de Beauregard in Flames of Paris, choreography by Alexei Ratmansky with use of the original choreography by Vasily Vainonen – debut on 19 July 2025

=== Tours ===
2010

- Tour of the Bolshoi Ballet at the National Centre for the Performing Arts, Beijing, China

Lord Wilson-Taor (Debut), Fisherman (The Pharaoh's Daughter, choreography by Pierre Lacotte according to the version of Marius Petipa)

2011

- Tour of the Bolshoi Ballet at the Paris Opera, Paris, France

Antoine Mistral (Flames of Paris, choreography by Alexei Ratmansky with use of the original choreography by Vasily Vainonen)

- As a guest artist with the Berlin State Ballet, Berlin, Germany

Phoebus (La Esmeralda, choreography by Yuri Burlaka and Vasily Medvedev, new version at Berlin State Ballet), with Iana Salenko

- As a guest artist on tour of the Russian Ballet Theatre to Stockholm, Sweden

Prince Siegfried (Swan Lake, choreography by Vyacheslav Gordeev)

- Chelyabinsk State Academic Opera and Ballet Theater, Chelyabinsk, Russia

Count Albrecht (Giselle, with Kristina Kretova)

2012

- Tour of the Bolshoi Ballet to North America

Sony Centre for the Performing Arts, Toronto, Canada

Prince Siegfried (Swan Lake, choreography by Yuri Grigorovich)

Kennedy Center, Washington D.C., US

Frantz (Coppélia, choreography by Sergei Vikharev)

Dorothy Chandler Pavilion, Los Angeles, US

Prince Siegfried (Swan Lake, choreography by Yuri Grigorovich)

2013

- Tour of the Bolshoi Ballet at the Ekaterinburg State Opera and Ballet Theatre, Ekaterinburg, Russia

The Leading Pair (Classical Symphony, choreography by Yuri Possokhov)

Five Pairs (Dream of Dream, choreography by Jorma Elo)

Apollo (Apollon Musagète, choreography by George Balanchine)

- The Samara Academic Opera and Ballet Theatre, Samara, Russia

Prince Siegfried (Swan Lake), with Anna Antonicheva

- Tour of the Bolshoi Ballet at the Royal Opera House, London, UK

Prince Siegfried (Swan Lake by Tchaikovsky, choreography by Yuri Grigorovich)

Prince Désiré, Blue Bird (The Sleeping Beauty by Tchaikovsky, new version by Yuri Grigorovich)

Antoine Mistral (Flames of Paris, choreography by Alexei Ratmansky)

2014

- Tour of the Bolshoi Ballet at the Paris Opera, Paris, France

The first dancer (Lost Illusions, choreography by Alexei Ratmansky)

- Tour of the Bolshoi Ballet at Kennedy Center, Washington D.C., US

Albrecht (Giselle, choreography by Yuri Grigorovich)

- Tour of the Bolshoi Ballet at Lincoln Center, New York, US

Prince Siegfried (Swan Lake, choreography by Yuri Grigorovich)

- Tour of Bolshoi Ballet at the Grimaldi Forum, Monte Carlo, Monaco

Lucentio (The Taming of the Shrew, choreography by Jean-Christophe Maillot）

2015

- Bayerisches Staatsballett, Munich, Germany

Armand (Lady of the Camellias, choreography by John Neumeier)

- Tour of Bolshoi Ballet in Hong Kong, China

Antoine Mistral (Flames of Paris, choreography by Alexei Ratmansky)

The leading couple of Diamonds（Jewels, choreography by George Balanchine)

- Mari State Opera and Ballet Theater, Yoshkar-Ola, Russia

Albrecht (Giselle, XIII Mari El Ballet Festival, with Olga Chelpanova)

- Macedonian Opera and Ballet, Skopje, Macedonia

Prince Siegfried (Swan Lake, with Nina Kaptsova)

=== Gala Concerts and Ballet Festivals ===
2009

- Festival of the Russian National Orchestra, Bolshoi Theatre, Russia

Spell of Escher (ru:Заклятие рода Эшеров, choreography by Vladimir Vasiliev)

2010

- International Festival "World Ballet Stars", Donetsk, Ukraine

Classical Pas de Deux

2011

- January, 6th Prague Ballet Gala, Prague, Czech Republic

Sleeping Beauty PDD, the Golden Age Tango, with Nina Kaptsova

- August, Closing Gala-Concert of the 8th Congress of the World Federation of UNESCO Clubs, Centres and Associations, Hanoi, Vietnam

Le Corsaire PDD, with Anna Tikhomirova

2012

- January, Gala Concert on Celebrating the 85th Anniversary of Yuri Grigorovich, Bolshoi Theatre, Russia

Nutcracker, with Ekaterina Krysanova

- April, Dance Open Festival, Saint Petersburg, Russia

La Esmeralda PDD, with Ekaterina Krysanova

- August, Dance Open Saint Petersburg-Savonlinna Ballet Days, Olavinlinna Castle, Finland

Classical PDD, the Golden Age Tango, with Anna Tikhomirova

2013

- February, Gala Concert of Future Stars of Benois de la Danse, Theatro Salieri, Italy

Le Corsaire PDD, Lullaby (choreography by Radu Poklitaru), with Anna Tikhomirova

- March, Russian Ballet Icons Gala 2013: Vaslav Nijinsky, English National Opera, Great Britain

Diamonds, with Evgenia Obraztsova

- April, Gala concert in honor of Marina Kondratieva, Bolshoi Theatre, Russia

Spring Water, with Anna Tikhomirova

- April, Dance Open Festival, Saint Petersburg, Russia

Male soloist in Two Pairs (Classical Symphony, choreography by Yuri Possokhov)

The Golden Age Tango, with Anna Tikhomirova

Triangle (Johannes Brahms, choreography by A. Pimonov), with Kristina Kretova and Anna Tikhomirova

- May, XXI Benois de la Danse Award Ceremony Gala, Bolshoi Theatre, Russia

Pas d'action of The Pharaoh's Daughter, with Evgenia Obraztsova

- September, Gala Concert of Russian Ballet Stars, Ríos Reyna del Teatro Teresa Carreño, Venezuela

Lullaby, with Anna Tikhomirova

- September，Kremlin Gala "Ballet Stars of the XXI century"，Kremlin Palace，Russia

Le Carnaval de Venise, with Evgenia Obraztsova

Lullaby, with Anna Tikhomirova

2014

- May, Sobinov Festival, Saratov Opera and Ballet Theater, Russia

Nutcracker, with Daria Khokhlova

- July, Nijinsky Gala, The Hamburg Ballet, Germany

Armand, Act II of Lady of the Camellias, with Olga Smirnova

- September, Kremlin Gala "Ballet Stars of the XXI century", Kremlin Palace, Russia

La Sylphide PDD, with Anna Tikhomirova

The Very Thought of You, new creation by Radu Poklitaru, with Anna Tikhomirova

- October, "A Celebration of Dance - The Hong Kong Ballet at 35", Hong Kong, China

Prince Siegfried, Act III of Swan Lake, with Kristina Kretova

- November, Gala Concert to celebrate the 85th birthday of musician Alexandra Pakhmutova, Kremlin Palace, Russia

You're My Meloday, new creation by Andrei Merkuriev, with Anna Tikhomirova

2015

- May, Hommage aux Grimaldi, Grimaldi Forum, Monaco

Giselle PDD, with Anna Tikhomirova

- September, Gala Russe, Grimaldi Forum, Monaco

The Very Thought of You, with Anna Tikhomirova

Chroma, with Anna Tikhomirova

Romeo and Juliet PDD, Choreography by Jean-Christophe Maillot, with Olga Smirnova

- October, Gala in Commemoration of Sophia Golovkina's Centennial, Bolshoi Theatre, Russia

The Sleeping Beauty PDD, with Nina Kaptsova

== Filmography ==
- Nutcracker, Bel Air Classiques, 2011 (Prince Nutcracker with Nina Kaptsova, filmed at the Bolshoi Theatre in 2010).
- Sleeping Beauty, Bel Air Classique, 2012 (Blue bird, filmed at the Bolshoi Theatre in 2011).
- Rudolf Nureyev: Dance to Freedom (title role, docudrama by BBC Two, 2015).

== Awards ==
- 2006 – Gold medal at the 3rd International Dance Olympus Competition (Berlin)
- 2008 – First Award for Male Dancer at the Open Competition "Arabesque" in Perm, as well as a prize named after Marius Petipa, "Pearl of the Urals", offered by Perm Public Foundation for Purity and Line of Classical Tradition, and the Press Jury Award for Fidelity to Moscow School Classical Tradition. In the same year, he was granted the youth award of "Triumph".
- 2009 – Special Award "Best Partner" at the XIth Moscow International Ballet Competition and Contest of Choreographers, and nominated as "Rising Star" for the "Soul of the Dance" award.
- 2012 – First Award "The Best Ballet Duet" at competition Big Ballet on Rossiya K - Russian television network (partner - Anna Tikhomirova).
- 2020 – National theatre award "The Golden Mask" in the Best Actor category in Ballet/Contemporary Dance.

== See also ==
- List of Russian ballet dancers
