= Filippo Beccari =

Filippo Beccari (fl. second half of the 18th century) was an Italian ballet dancer and ballet master working in the Russian Empire, and a founder of the Moscow Ballet School.

== History ==
In the beginning of the 18th century, many professionals, including theatrical figures travelled to Russia. Filippo Beccari was one of them.

== Biography ==
It is not known, when Beccari was born, or when he arrived in Russia. But it is known that in the beginning of 1770th years he worked in the Saint Petersburg imperial ballet troupe. Filippo Beccari was caused a steel by the teacher of a ballet class and he with his wife-ballerina has left Petersburg to Moscow.

== Career ==
Filippo Beccari became the first teacher of ballet in Moscow.

Under the contract, Filippo Beccari and his wife didn't receive a payment in the course of work, and should receive for the learned actors: on 250 roubles for each dancer-soloist and on 150 roubles for the figurant. The first class consisted of 26 little boys and 28 little girls. They were engaged four times a week for four hours. Then the number of ballet pupils has increased. After three years results have surpassed all expectations: from 62 pupils 24 were taken on a scene by soloists, and the others have entered into corps de ballet troupe.

He headed a ballet classes with 1773 for 1778. In 1778 he was replaced by the French choreographer Leopold Paradise.

== See also ==
- List of Russian ballet dancers
