= Crystal Turandot Awards =

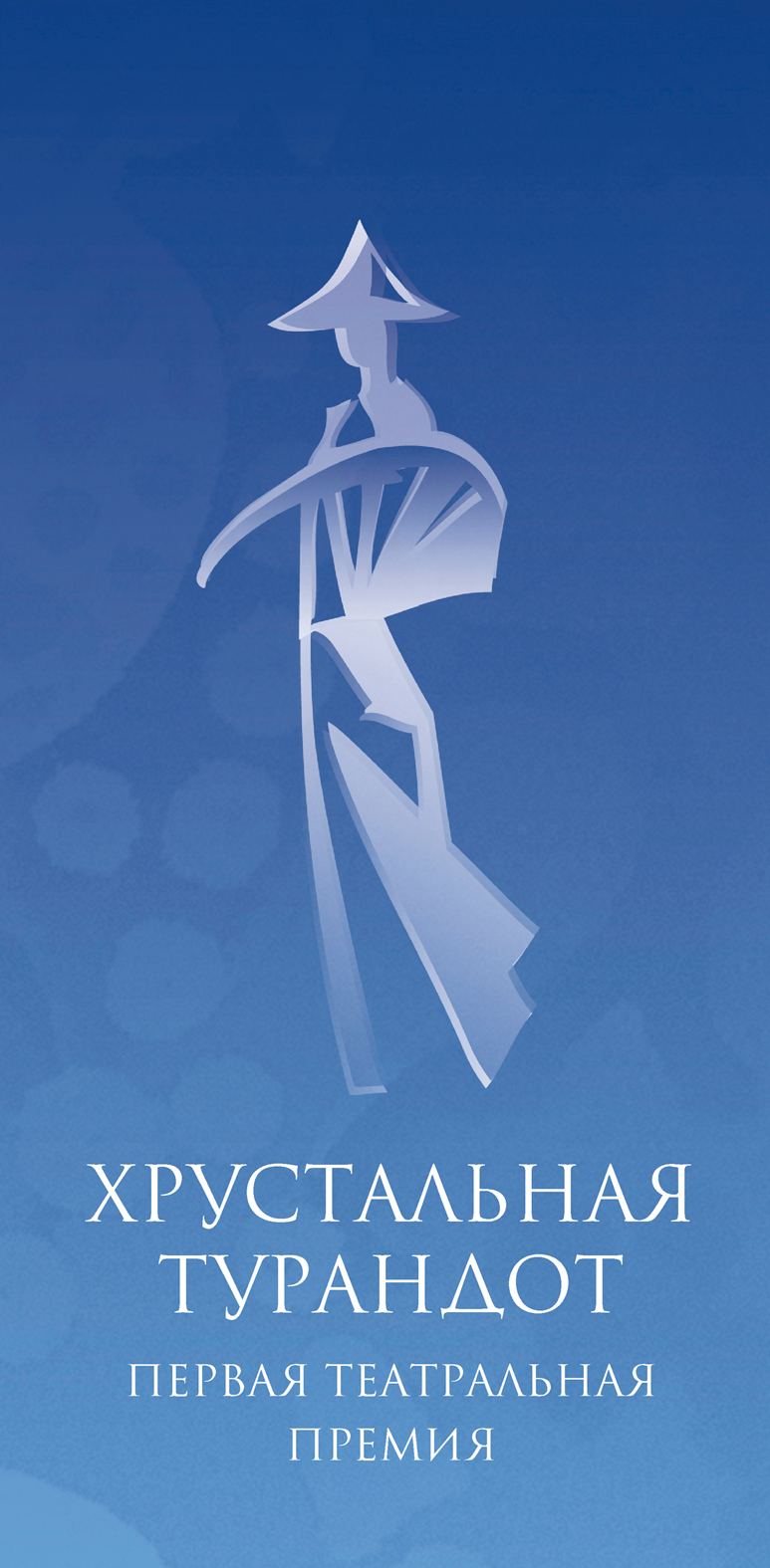
Logo

The Crystal Turandot Awards are Russian theatre awards created in 1991. They are awarded at the Vakhtangov Theatre in Moscow, where the winner receives a crystal figurine of Princess Turandot, the main character of Turandot, a play first staged at the theatre in 1922.

It has been described as the highest theatre prize of Moscow.

== Past winners ==
- In 1993, dancers Ekaterina Maximova and Vladimir Vasiliev won the award for theatre arts. Theatre and film director Pyotr Fomenko won an award.
- In 1997/8, Dmitry Nazarov was awarded Best Actor, for playing Satin in the play TSATRA.
- In 2008, Boris Messerer won a Crystal Turandot.
- In 2010, Armenian actor Armen Dzhigarkhanyan won the award.
- In 2012, Vakhtangov Theatre's oldest actress, 96-year-old Galina Konovalova, was honoured with the award in the Honour and Dignity category. Actor Valentin Gaft also received an award.
- In 2016, Vladimir Simonov was awarded the prize.
