= Dmitry Belogolovtsev =

Russian ballet dancer

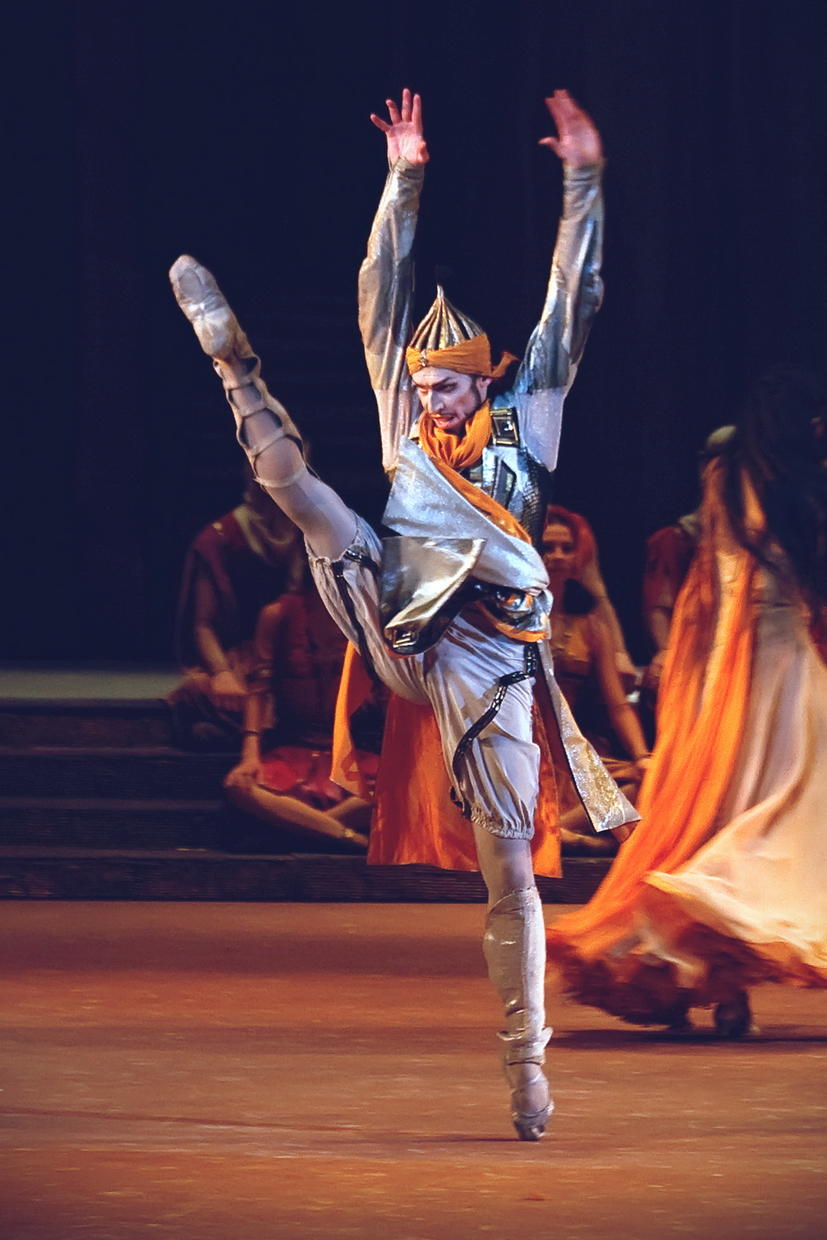
Belogolovtsev performing as Abderahman in the Bolshoi's production of Raymonda in 2010

Dmitry Vladimirovich Belogolovtsev (Russian: Дмитрий Владимирович Белоголовцев) (born 26 November 1973) is a Russian ballet dancer, and former principal dancer of the Bolshoi Ballet.

== Background ==
Born in Lviv, then part of the Ukrainian SSR, in the Soviet Union, Belogolovtsev joined the Moscow State Academy of Choreography in 1992, under the tutelage of Professor Alexander Bondarenko. He graduated in 1995, and joined the Bolshoi Ballet. He has taken part on various international projects, dancing alongside Nina Ananiashvili, Nadezhda Gracheva, and Anna Antonicheva. In 1993 he was award third prize and the bronze medal at the International Ballet Competition in Moscow, and in 1998 won the second prize at the USA International Ballet Competition. Also in 1998 he was awarded the title of Honoured Artist of Russia. Between 2000 and 2004 he appeared alongside Nina Ananiashvili and Alexei Fadeechev in adaptations of Stanton Welch's ballets Green and Between Heaven and Earth, and Alexei Ratmansky's The Charms of Mannerism and Dreams of Japan.

Belogolovtsev was nominated for the "Golden Mask" for "Best Actor in the Ballet" in 2000, for his performance in the lead role in Afternoon Rest of the Faun. In 2003 he played Ferhad in Legend of Love, for which he was nominated for the Prix Benois de la Danse. Between 2004 and 2015 he performed with Sergei Filin and Anna Antonicheva in the Mayakovsky Theatre's Love Through the Eyes of a Detective. In 2008 he was honoured as a People's Artist of Russia.

== Bibliography ==
- Михайлова Е. Дмитрий Белоголовцев. Прелюдия // Большой театр : Newspaper. — Moscow, 1997. — № 30 May.
- Вязовкина В. Заслуженный артист Российской Федерации Дмитрий Белоголовцев // Большой театр : Newspaper. — Moscow, 1998. — № 17 December.
- Вязовкина В. Дмитрий Белоголовцев: Хочется танцевать модерн // Известия : Newspaper. — Moscow, 2001. — № 10 April.
- Ануфриева А. Тоталитарный балет // Россiя : Newspaper. — Moscow, 2003. — № 19 August.
- Абаулин Д. От Яшки до Спартака // Российская газета : Newspaper. — Moscow, 2006. — № 3 April.
- Невилько М. Герой на цыпочках, или Лучший Спартак современности // Аэропорт : Journal. — Р-н-Д., 2007. — № 10.
- Хризман Э. Приезжает Дмитрий Белоголовцев // Коль а-Шарон : Newspaper. — Tel-Aviv, 2008. — № 16 October.
