= Chimes: Upon Reading V. M. Shukshin =

1982 choral symphony by Valery Gavrilin

Chimes
- Upon Reading V. M. Shukshin
- Choral symphony by Valery Gavrilin
- Text: Russian folk texts, Albina Shulgina, and Valery Gavrilin
- Language: Russian
- Composed: 1978–1982
- Dedication: To Vladimir Nikolayevich Minin
- Published: 1985
- Publisher: Sovietsky kompozitor Kompozitor Sankt-Peterburg
- Duration: ca. 85 minutes
- Movements: 20
- Scoring: Oboe, percussion, 2 solo singers, speaker, and SATB choir

Chimes: Upon Reading V. M. Shukshin (Russian: Перезвоны — По прочтении В. М. Шукшина, romanized: Perezvony — Po prochtenii V. M. Shukshina) is a choral symphony by Valery Gavrilin. It was composed between 1978 and 1982, and premiered in 1984. The texts, inspired after a reading of Vasily Shukshin, are compiled from folk poetry, Albina Shulgina, and Gavrilin himself. The premiere in 1984 was seen as a turning away from European themes to Russian themes in Gavrilin's output. The work was recorded by Melodiya in 1988, with the soloists Natalia Gerasimova, Svetlana Beloklokova, Ludmila Slepneva, Anatoly Lyubimov, and the Moscow Chamber Choir, conducted by Vladimir Minin.

== Instrumentation ==
The instrumentation for Chimes is as follows:

Woodwind
Oboe

Percussion
Timpani
Triangle
Snare drum
Whip
Cymbals
Bass drum
Tam-tam
Tubular bells

Voices
Soprano solo
Tenor solo
Speaker (male voice)
SATB choir (sopranos dived into two sections)

== Movements ==
1. Cheerful in Spirit (Russian: Весело на душе, romanized: Veselo na dushe)
2. Death of a Bandit (Russian: Смерть разбойника, romanized: Smert' razboynika)
3. Little Reed Pipe (Russian: Дудочка, romanized: Dudochka)
4. Nonsense (Russian: Ерунда, romanized: Yerunda)
5. Little Reed Pipe
6. Hangout (Russian: Посиделки, romanized: Posidelki)
7. Little Reed Pipe
8. Ti-ri-ri (Russian: Ти-ри-ри, romanized: Ti-ri-ri)
9. Little Reed Pipe
10. Evening Music (Russian: Вечерняя музыка, romanized: Verchernyaya muzyka)
11. Little Reed Pipe
12. Sunday (Russian: Воскресенье, romanized: Voskresen'ye)
13. Little Reed Pipe
14. Tell Me, Tell Me, Darling (Russian: Скажи, скажи, голубчик, romanized: Skazhi, skazhi, golubnik)
15. Ugly Lady (Russian: Страшенная баба, romanized: Strashennaya baba)
16. White-White Snow (Russian: Белы-белы снеги, romanized: Bely-bely snegi)
17. Prayer (Russian: Молитва, romanized: Molitva)
18. Mother River (Russian: Матка-река, romanized: Matka-reka)
19. Little Reed Pipe
20. The Road (Russian: Дорога, romanized: Doroga)
