= 7369 Gavrilin =

Asteroid

Discovery
- Discovered by: T. Smirnova
- Discovery site: Crimean Astrophysical Obs.
- Discovery date: 13 January 1975

Designations
- Pronunciation: /ɡəvˈriːlɪn/
- Named after: Valery Gavrilin (Гаври́лин) (Russian composer)
- Alternative designations: 1975 AN · 1975 AX; 1985 YU · 1986 AG
- Minor planet category: Mars-crosser; Phocaea · binary

Orbital characteristics
- Epoch 27 April 2019 (JD 2458600.5)
- Uncertainty parameter 0
- Observation arc: 43.79 yr (15,995 d)
- Aphelion: 3.1269 AU
- Perihelion: 1.6119 AU
- Semi-major axis: 2.3694 AU
- Eccentricity: 0.3197
- Orbital period (sidereal): 3.65 yr (1,332 d)
- Mean anomaly: 86.439°
- Mean motion: 0° 16^{m} 12.72^{s} / day
- Inclination: 21.817°
- Longitude of ascending node: 278.24°
- Argument of perihelion: 113.26°
- Known satellites: 1 (D: 2.41 km; P: 49.2 h) (Note: Lightcurve plot (7369) Gavrilin by Higgins and Pravec, from Ondrejov data obtained by the NEO Photometric Program and collaborating projects. Pravec notes that the binary system has a lower limit of 0.36 for its secondary to primary diameter ratio (H estimated assuming G).)
- Earth MOID: 0.7338 AU (286 LD)

Physical characteristics
- Mean diameter: 4.91±0.88 km 5.49±1.41 km 5.51±0.55 km
- Synodic rotation period: 49.12 h (Note: Pravec (2008) web: rotation period 49.12 hours with a brightness amplitude of 0.25±0.02 mag. Quality Code is 3. Summary figures for (7369) Gavrilin at the LCDB and Pravec, P.; Wolf, M.; Sarounova, L. (2008).)
- Geometric albedo: 0.27; 0.28; 0.305
- Spectral type: S (assumed)
- Absolute magnitude (H): 13.10; 13.12; 13.20; 13.53

7369 Gavrilin, provisional designation 1975 AN, is a stony Phocaean asteroid, sizable Mars-crosser, and binary system on an eccentric orbit from the inner regions of the asteroid belt, approximately 5.5 kilometers (3.4 miles) in diameter. It was discovered on 13 January 1975, by Russian astronomer Tamara Smirnova at the Crimean Astrophysical Observatory in Nauchnyj, on the Crimean peninsula. The assumed S-type asteroid has a long rotation period of 49.1 hours. It was named after Russian composer Valery Gavrilin. The discovery of its 2.4-kilometer sized minor-planet moon was announced in October 2008.

== Orbit and classification ==
Gavrilin is both a member of the main belt's Phocaea family (701) and a member of the Mars-crossing asteroids, a dynamically unstable group between the main belt and the near-Earth populations, crossing the orbit of Mars at 1.66 AU.

It orbits the Sun in the inner asteroid belt at a distance of 1.6–3.1 AU once every 3 years and 8 months (1,332 days; semi-major axis of 2.37 AU). Its orbit has an eccentricity of 0.32 and an inclination of 22° with respect to the ecliptic. The body's observation arc begins with its first observation as 1975 AN at the Purple Mountain Observatory in January 1975, eleven days prior to its official discovery observation, 1975 AX by Tamara Smirnova at Nauchnyj.

== Numbering and naming ==
This minor planet was numbered on 23 January 1997 (M.P.C. 28818). It was named after the awarded Russian composer Valery Gavrilin (1939–1999). The asteroid's name was suggested by the Union of Concert Workers of Russia, and its official naming citation was published by the Minor Planet Center on 24 January 2000 (M.P.C. 38196).

== Physical characteristics ==
Gavrilin is an assumed, stony S-type asteroid, the most common spectral type in the inner asteroid belt. The assumption also agrees with the overall spectral type for the Phocaea family.

=== Rotation period and satellite ===
In January 2008, rotational lightcurves of Gavrilin were obtained from photometric observations by the BINAST group including David Higgins at the Hunters Hill Observatory (E14) in Australia and Petr Pravec at the Ondřejov Observatory in the Czech Republic. Lightcurve analysis gave a rotation period of 49.12 hours with a brightness amplitude of 0.25 magnitude (U=3/3). The photometric observation also revealed that Gavrilin is a synchronous binary asteroid with a minor-planet moon in its orbit. The discovery was announced in October 2008. The satellite measures approximately 2.41 kilometers in diameter (a secondary-to-primary diameter-ratio of at least 0.32) and has an orbital period identical to that of the primary's rotation, 49.12 hours.

=== Diameter and albedo ===
According to the survey carried out by the NEOWISE mission of NASA's Wide-field Infrared Survey Explorer (WISE), Gavrilin measures 4.91 and 5.49 kilometers in diameter and its surface has an albedo of 0.27 and 0.28, respectively. A 2017-WISE-study dedicated to Mars-crossing asteroids determined a diameter of 5.51 kilometers despite a higher albedo of 0.305. The Collaborative Asteroid Lightcurve Link assumes a standard albedo for a stony asteroid of 0.20 and calculates a diameter of 5.74 kilometers based on an absolute magnitude of 13.61, while the Johnston's Archive estimates a diameter of 7.54 kilometers for the primary.

==== Sizable Mars-crosser ====
With a diameter of 5.5 kilometers, Gavrilin is one of the smallest "sizable" Mars-crossers (5–15 km). These include 3581 Alvarez (13.7 km) 1065 Amundsenia (9.8 km), 1139 Atami (9.4 km), 3737 Beckman (14.4 km), 1474 Beira (15.5 km), 5682 Beresford (7.3 km), 1011 Laodamia (7.4 km), 6170 Levasseur (5.7 km), 1727 Mette (5.4 km), 1131 Porzia (7.1 km), 1235 Schorria (5.6 km), 985 Rosina (8.2 km), 1310 Villigera (15.2 km), and 1468 Zomba (7 km), which are themselves smaller than the largest members of this dynamical group, namely, 132 Aethra, 323 Brucia (former Mars-crosser), 1508 Kemi, 2204 Lyyli and 512 Taurinensis, all larger than 20 kilometers.
