= Anna Antonicheva =

Anna Antonicheva (Russian: Анна Анатольевна Антоничева) is a ballerina and People's Artist of Russia, who was a principal dancer of Bolshoi Ballet.

== Biography ==
Antonicheva was born in 1973 in Baku, Azerbaijan, and was a graduate of the Baku Ballet School. In 1988, she won both the gold medal and the audience prize at the 1st Transcaucasian Competition of Ballet Dancers. Subsequently, she studied at the Moscow Choreographic Academy, graduating in 1991. The same year, she joined Bolshoi Theatre, where she performed roles such as the Hungarian Bride in Swan Lake, Shireen in Legend of Love, Phrygia in Spartacus and Myrtha in Giselle. In 1997, she made debuts as Princess Aurora and Princess Florine in The Sleeping Beauty and the same year danced as Henriette in Raymonda and Nikiya in La Bayadère.

In 1999 she went on a tour to Kyrgyzstan where she danced in Don Quixote with Dmitry Belogolovtsev, and in 2000 she traveled to Japan where she appeared in La Bayadère at the New National Theatre Tokyo with Carlos Acosta. She first danced the title role in Giselle in 1999 and Odette-Odile in Yuri Grigorovich's production of Swan Lake in 2001. She portrayed Raymonda in 2003 and the same year appeared as Esmeralda in Roland Petit's Notre-Dame de Paris. In 2004 she performed in George Balanchine's Concerto Barocco and Agon, and in 2005 danced Titania in John Neumeier's A Midsummer Night's Dream. In 2006 Antonicheva performed Rita in The Golden Age and in 2007 played Medora in Le Corsaire and danced in Balanchine's Serenade. In 2008 she originated the role of Mireille de Poitiers in Alexei Ratmansky's production of Flames of Paris, and in 2010 she danced William Forsythe's Herman Schmerman.

Antonicheva departed the Bolshoi Ballet in 2017.
