= Valery Gavrilin =

Russian composer (1939–1999)

- Born: Valery Aleksandrovich Gavrilin; 17 August 1939; Vologda, Russian SFSR, USSR
- Died: 28 January 1999 (aged 59); Saint Petersburg, Russia
- Occupation: Composer

Valery Aleksandrovich Gavrilin (Russian: Валерий Александрович Гаврилин; 17 August 1939 – 28 January 1999) was a Soviet and Russian composer. People's Artist of the RSFSR (1985).

== Biography ==
Valery Gavrilin was born in 1939 in Vologda. When he was 3, his father died as a volunteer during the Siege of Leningrad. His mother was imprisoned when he was 10 and Gavrilin was sent to an orphanage in the village of Kovyrino near Vologda. At the age of 11, Gavrilin entered a school of music where I.M. Belozemtsev, a teacher at Leningrad Conservatory, happened to hear him and from the age of 12 to 16, Gavrilin went to the children's school in Leningrad to study clarinet, piano and composition. In 1954 he graduated from the Conservatory with two specialities: composition (under professor Orest Evlakhov) and musicology (under professor F.A. Rubtsov). Shortly thereafter, Gavrilin published the vocal cycle that would make his name, the Russian Notebook. He continued at the Conservatory as a teacher.

In television and film, he often collaborated with director Aleksandr Arkadevich Belinskiy.

Valery Gavrilin died in 1999 at the age of 59 in St. Petersburg, following two severe heart attacks. The asteroid 7369 Gavrilin was named in his memory. The name was suggested by the Union of Concert Workers of Russia, and the official naming citation was published by the Minor Planet Center on 24 January 2000 (M.P.C. 38196).

The 70th Anniversary of Gavrilin's birth was marked by a Gavrilin Festival in October 2009, which included concerts in his memory in Saint Petersburg, Moscow, Vologda, and Cherepovets, and which included a performance by the Tchaikovsky Symphony Orchestra conducted by Vladimir Fedoseyev.

== Works ==
=== Ballets ===
- Anyuta, ballet in 2 acts, libretto by film director Aleksandr Belinskiy based on texts by Anton Chekhov (Анюта 1982)
- House on the Road, ballet in 1 act, libretto by Aleksandr Belinskiy based on texts by the poem by Aleksandr Tvardovsky (Дом у дороги 1984)
- Lieutenant Romashov, based on texts by Aleksandr Kuprin (1985)
- Balzamin's Marriage, based on texts by Alexander Ostrovsky (Женитьба Бальзаминова 1989)

=== Opera ===
- The Sailor and the Rowan Tree (Моряк и рябина 1968)
- Family Album (Семейный альбом 1969)
- Miracle Play of the Three Youths (Пещное действо 1970) (based on the miracle play of the fiery furnace story in the Russian Orthodox Church)

=== Orchestral music ===
- The Cockroach, symphonic suite (Тараканище 1963)
- Overture in C major for symphony orchestra (1964)
- Adagio for Strings (1964)
- Wedding, Symphonic Suite No. 1 (Свадебная 1967)
- Theatre Divertissment, Symphonic Suite No. 2 (1969)
- Russian, Symphonic Suite No. 3 (Русская 1970)
- French, Symphonic Suite No. 4 (Французская 1973)
- Portraits, Symphonic Suite No. 5 (Портреты 1979))
- In Memory of Batiushkov, waltz for symphony orchestra (Памяти Батюшкова 1981)
- Anyuta, Symphonic Suite No. 6 (Анюта 1982)
- House on the Road, Symphonic Suite No. 7 (Дом у дороги 1984)

=== Chamber-vocal music ===
- About Love, song cycle based on texts by Vadim Shefner (О любви 1958)
- Satires, song cycle based on texts by Arvīds Grigulis (Сатиры 1959)
- German Notebook No. 1, song cycle based on texts by Heinrich Heine (1961)
- Russian Notebook, song cycle based on folk texts (1964, Glinka State Prize of the RSFSR in 1965)
- The Seasons, song cycle based on folk texts and Sergei Yesenin (Времена года 1969)
- Drunken Week, song cycle based on folk texts (Пьяная неделя 1970?)
- German Notebook No. 2, song cycle based on texts by Heinrich Heine (Немецкая тетрадь № 2 1972)
- Evening, song cycle for 2 voices and piano. Part 1 "Little Album", texts: folk, Albina Shulgina, and Gavrilin (Вечерок 1 «Альбомчик» 1973). Part 2 "Dances, Writing, Conclusion", texts: Semyon Nadson, Ivan Bunin, Anna Akhmatova, Albina Shulgina, and Gavrilin (Вечерок 2 «Танцы, письма, окончание» 1975)
- German Notebook No. 3, song cycle for vocal quartet and piano based on texts by Heinrich Heine (1976, unfinished)
- Marina, based on texts by Marina Tsvetaeva (Марина 1967)
- Three Songs of Ophelia, based on Shakespeare for a production of Hamlet at the Young People's Theatre of Leningrad directed by Zinovy Korogodsky (1971)
- "The City Sleeps", based on a text by Albina Shulgina (Город спит 1978)
- "Forgive Me", based on a text by Alexander Volodin (Простите меня)
- Poem No. 426 for soloist, instrumental ensemble, 328-RS computer, and tape.

=== Vocal-symphonic music ===
- Buffoons, for soloist, male chorus, ballet and orchestra; based on texts by Vadim Korostilev (Скоморохи 1967)
- War Letters, vocal-symphonic poem for soloists, children's and mixed choirs, and symphony orchestra; based on texts by Albina Shulgina (Военные письма 1972)
- Earth, vocal-symphonic song cycle for the free composition of the choir, soloist and symphony orchestra; based on texts by Albina Shulgina (Земля 1974)
- A Toast "Apotheosis", cantata for mixed chorus and orchestra, based on texts by Vladimir Maksimov (Здравица «Апофеоз» 1977)
- Incantation, cantata for female choir and orchestra; based on texts by Albina Shulgina (Заклинание 1977)
- Wedding, for soloist, mixed chorus, ballet dancers, and symphony orchestra. Texts: folk, Albina Shulgina, and Gavrilin (Свадьба 1978-1982)
- Chimes: Upon Reading V. M. Shukshin, a miracle play symphony for soloists, mixed chorus, oboe, percussion, and narrator; texts: folk, Albina Shulgina, and Gavrilin (1978–1982) (Перезвоны 1982)
- Shepherd and Shepherdess, for soloists, large chorus, and mixed instrumental ensemble; based on texts by Viktor Astafyev (Пастух и пастушка, 1983; unfinished)

=== Choral music ===
- People of the World, based on texts by Sergei Vasiliev (Люди мира на слова С. Васильева, 1962)
- We Spoke of Art, cantata for mixed chorus a cappella based on texts by Gavrilin (Мы говорили об искусстве, 1963)
- In Memory of the Fallen, a choral cycle (Памяти павших, 1963)
- Don Captain, concert rondo for mixed chorus, based on texts by R. Barannikova (Дон капитан, 1969)
- Choruses, for mixed chorus, folk lyrics (Припевки, 1972)

=== Instrumental chamber works ===
- String Quartets Nos. 1 – 3 (1960, 1962, 1964)
- Adagio in Polyphonic Style (1964)
- A Poem, for violin and piano (1963)
- Violin Sonata (1964)
- Piano Sonata (1964)
- Compositions, for piano 2-hands (three books)
- Sketches, for piano 4 hands («Зарисовки» 1970s)

=== Theatre music ===
- How Kopachi Got Married, musical comedy in 1 Act of the play by L Tabi. (Так женился Копачи - пьесе Л.Таби).

36 suites of Incidental Theatre music: "How Kopachi got married Kopaci" «Так женился Копачи», "marching march", «Походный марш» "Armored Train 14-69" «Бронепоезд 14-69» "based on texts by the execution request" «После казни прошу» "based on texts by 100 years in the Birch grove" «Через 100 лет в Березовой роще» "Two winters and three summers," «Две зимы и три лета» "Crime and Punishment " «Преступлени и наказание» "Not to part with his beloved" «С любимыми не расставайтесь» "Steps of the Commander" «Шаги командора» "His people - numbered" «Свои люди — сочтемся» "Above the bright water" «Над светлой водой» "Three sacks of wheat" «Три мешка сорной пшеницы» "Prunus" «Черемуха» and others (1959–1977)

=== Film music ===
- 1966 - On the wild shore (На диком береге director Anatoli Granik)
- 1968 - Source (Источник director Anatoli Granik)
- 1968 - On the wedding day (В день свадьбы director Vadim Mikhailov)
- 1970 - Vasily Merkur'ev (Василий Меркурьев Telefilm, dir. Bychkov)
- 1969 - Anna's Happiness (Счастье Анны dir. Yuri Rogov)
- 1971 - The month of August (Месяц август dir. Vadim Mikhailov)
- 1972 - Theatrical History (Театральные истории dir. Aleksandr Belinskiy)
- 1979 - The Knight of Knyazh (Рыцарь из Княж-города dir. Vadim Mikhailov)
- 1980 - Pier (Пристань dir. V. Sorokin)
- 1981 - A Village History (Деревенская история dir. Vitali Kanevsky)
- 1982 - Anyuta (Анюта dir. Alexander Belinsky, choreographer Vladimir Vasiliev)
- 1986 - Hurt (Обида prod. Arkady Sirenko)
- 1987 - Funny story (Байка dir. Georgi Burkov, Herman Lavrov)
- 1989 - Balzamin's Marriage (Женитьба Бальзаминова dir. Aleksandr Belinskiy)
- 1993 - Provincial benefice (Провинциальный бенефис dir. Aleksandr Belinskiy)

== Selected recordings ==
Discography

- A House on the Road. With Sviridov, Oratorio Pathetique. Vladimir Fedoseyev. reissued Relief.
- Songs of Valery Gavrilin: The Russian Notebook. Ophelia’s Songs. The Seasons. Mila Shkirtil (mezzo-soprano). Yuri Serov (piano). Northern Flowers, NF/PMA 9955
- Gavrilin First German Notebook. Sergei Leiferkus (baritone). Irina Golovnyova (piano). Recorded in 1981. Sound-producer Gerhard Tses. Released with recordings of songs by Vladimir Shcherbachov, Veniamin Basner, Yuri Falik. Compozitor, St. Petersburg.
- Gavrilin Sketches (18 pieces) for piano 4 hands. Riga Piano duo Nora Novik & Raffi Kharajanyan. Compozitor, St. Petersburg, 2000.

Video

- Anyuta. Ekaterina Maximova and Vladimir Vasiliev with the Bolshoi Ballet 1982. DVD VAI 2007

== Awards and honours ==
- Glinka State Prize of the RSFSR (1967)
- Honoured Worker of the Arts Industry of the RSFSR (1979)
- Lenin Komsomol Prize (1980)
- USSR State Prize (1985)
- People's Artist of the RSFSR (1985)
