= Nina Kaptsova =

Russian ballet dancer

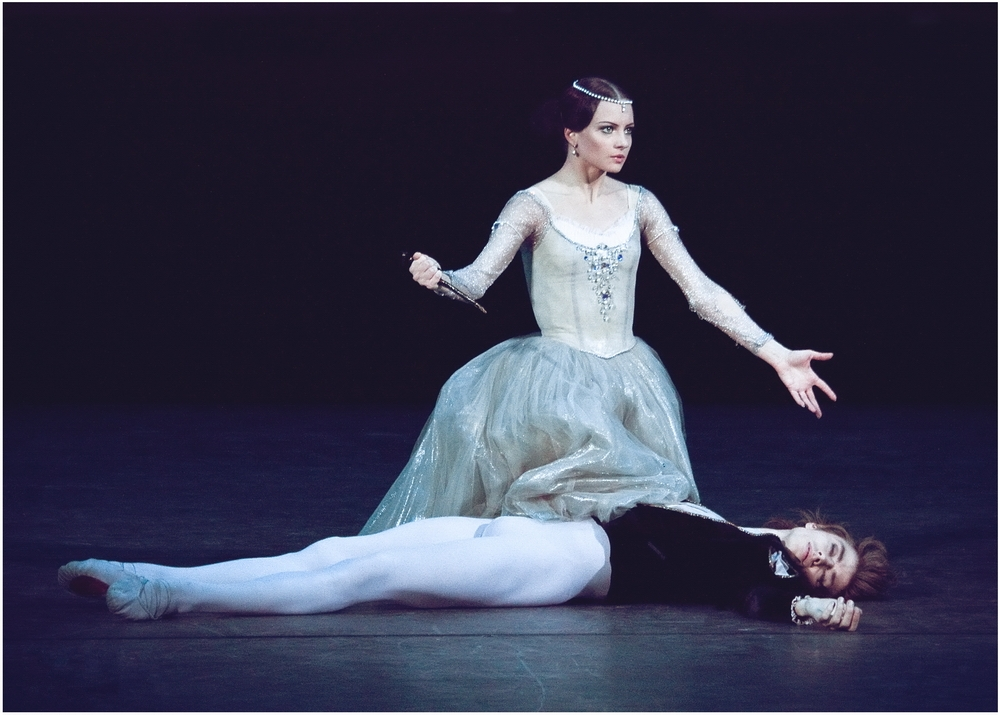
- Nina Kaptsova and Artem Ovcharenko performing Romeo and Juliet in Bolshoi Theatre
- Born: Nina Aleksandrovna Kaptsova; 16 October 1978 (age 47); Rostov-on-Don, Russian SFSR, Soviet Union (now Russia)
- Occupation: Ballet dancer
- Employer: Bolshoi Theatre

Nina Aleksandrovna Kaptsova (Russian: Нина Александровна Капцова; born 16 October 1978) is a Russian prima ballerina of the Bolshoi Ballet.

== Biography ==
Kaptsova was born on 16 October 1978 in Rostov-on-Don, Russia. She was trained at the Moscow Choreographic Academy under the direction of Sofia Golovkina. After her graduation, she became a member of the Bolshoi Ballet. Her coach at Bolshoi was Marina Kondratieva, later Nina Semizorova.

Her first appearance was in the role of a cupid in Don Quixote in 1997, and the same year she played a "fairy of playfulness" in The Sleeping Beauty, which was produced by Yuri Grigorovich.

In 1998, she played Sleeping Beauty again, this time as a maid of honour, and the same year played Gumpe in La Bayadère, also produced by Yuri Grigorovich. In 1999, she appeared as Marie in The Nutcracker, which was again produced by Grigorovich, and the same year performed in Swan Lake. In 2000 and 2004, she reprised her role in Sleeping Beauty, first as the Princess Aurora and then as the Prince's friend. In the same year, she had a few solo roles including that in Mozartiana and The Limpid Stream, in which she played the role of Zina.

In 2006, she appeared as Shirin in The Legend of Love (Легенда о любви) and the same year played the role of Rita in The Golden Age. In 2007, she performed in The Lesson, and in 2008 appeared in Herman Levenskiold's La Sylphide, Pyotr Tchaikovsky's The Nutcracker, and in Flames of Paris, in which she played the role of Adeline. In 2009, she performed in such plays as The Queen of Spades, in which she portrayed Liza and played the title role in La Esmeralda.

Since 19 November 2011, she has been a principal ballerina of the Bolshoi Theatre.

During the Bolshoi Ballet’s tour of the United States in May 2012, Kaptsova’s performance as Swanilda in Coppélia received widespread acclaim from American ballet critics.

She preferred vivid, demonic roles and regarded the portrayal of negative characters—whose nature was at odds with her own gentle, lyrical, and romantic temperament—as a particularly compelling acting challenge.

In 2024 Kaptsova retired from the stage and became a ballet mistress at the Bolshoi.

== Awards ==
- The International "New Names" project Laureate
- Benois de la Dance – 2000 Diploma Winner
- "The Soul of the Dance" in nomination "The Star"
- An Honoured Artist of Russian Federation, Distinction for the Achievements in Culture from the Ministry of Culture of Russian Federation, Distinction for the Achievements in Culture from the Ministry of Culture

== Roles ==
- Adam, Giselle – Giselle
- Adam, Le Corsaire – Gulnara
- Asaf, Flames of Paris – Adeline, Mirelle de Poitiers
- Balanchine, Jewels – Emeralds, Rubies and Diamonds (leading part)
- Beethoven and Richter, Short Time Together
- Chopin, Lady of the Camellias – Marguerite Gautier
- Debussy. Afternoon of a Faun – Soloist
- Delerue, The Lesson – Pupil
- Delibes, Coppélia – Swanilda
- Demutsky, A Hero of Our Time - Princess Mary
- Demutsky, Nureyev - Margot
- Desyatnikov, Lost Illusions - Coralie
- Gavrilin, Annie – Annie
- Glass, In the Upper Room – Soloist
- Gottschalk, Tarantella – Soloist
- Herold, Vain Precautions – Liza
- Khachaturian, Spartacus – Phrygia
- Levenshell, La Sylphide – La Sylphide
- Melikov, The Legend of Love - Shirin
- Mendelssohn-Bartholdy and Ligeti, A Midsummer Night's Dream – Elena
- Minkus, Don Quixote – Kitri, Amur
- Mozart, Phantasy on the Casanova – Lady
- Prokofiev, Romeo and Juliet – Juliet
- Prokofiev, Ivan the Terrible - Anastasia
- Pugni, La Esmeralda – Esmeralda
- Pugni, The Pharaoh's Daughter – Ramzea
- Rachmaninov, Paganini – Muze
- Shostakovich, The Bright Stream – Zina
- Shostakovich, The Golden Age – Rita (Margo)
- Shostakovich, The Taming of the Shrew - Bianca
- Stravinsky, Petrushka – Ballerina
- Stravinsky, Agon
- Tchaikovsky, Pas de Deux
- Tchaikovsky, Les Presages – Frivolity, Passion
- Tchaikovsky, Mozartiana – Soloist
- Tchaikovsky, Pique Dame – Liza
- Tchaikovsky, The Nutcracker – Marie
- Tchaikovsky, The Sleeping Beauty – Princess Aurora, Princess Florine
- Tchaikovsky, Swan Lake – Odetta/Odilie
- Tchaikovsky, Onegin - Tatiana
