= Moscow State Academy of Choreography =

Ballet school in Moscow, Russia

- Московская государственная академия хореографии
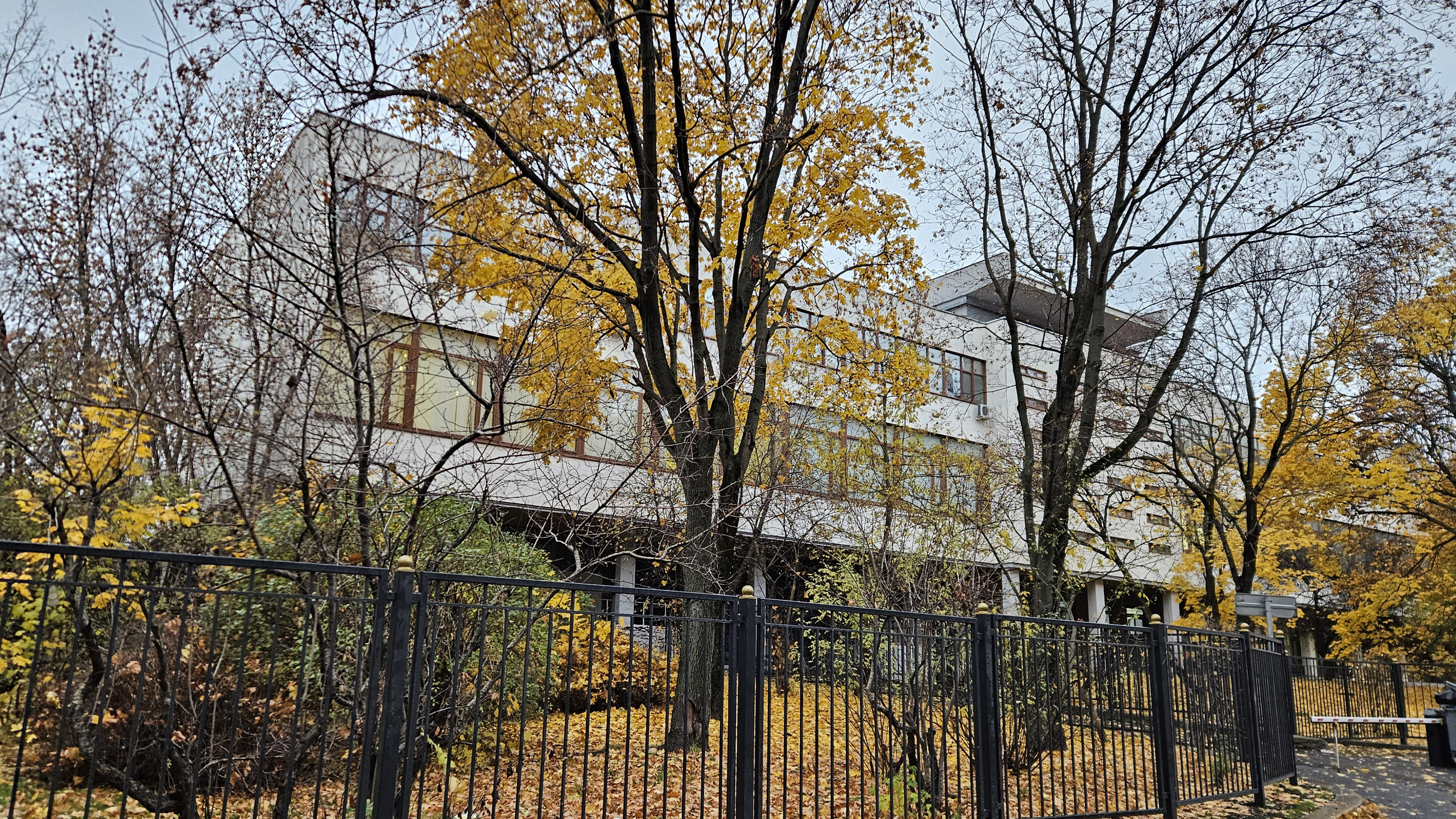
- The academy in October 2024
- Type: Public
- Established: 1763
- Location: Moscow, Russia; 55.7217°N 37.5809°E
- Website: www.balletacademy.ru

The Moscow State Academy of Choreography (Russian: Московская государственная академия хореографии), commonly known as the Bolshoi Ballet Academy, is a ballet school located in Moscow, Russia. It is the affiliate school of the Bolshoi Ballet. Founded on December 23, 1773 as the second ballet school in Russia, it entered into a contract with the Italian teacher-choreographer Filippo Becari, regarded as the "most capable of teaching" children to learn to "dance with all possible precision and to show themselves publicly in all pantomime ballets".

The Bolshoi Ballet receives the majority of its dancers from the academy, as do most other Moscow ballet companies. Numerous choreographers, instructors and graduates of the academy have become renowned. The academy was awarded the Japanese Foreign Minister’s Commendation for their contributions to promotion of cultural exchange through art between Japan and Russia on December 1, 2020.

== History ==
Bolshoi is the oldest theatrical school in Moscow, founded as an orphanage by order of Empress Catherine II in 1763. It was not until 1773 that the first dance classes were taught at the home. Other names the school is known by include; the Bolshoi Academy, the Bolshoi Ballet School, the Moscow Choreographic Institute, the Moscow Ballet School, the Bolshoi Moscow Ballet School and the Bolshoi Theatre Ballet School.

Heads:

| Period | Head |
|---|---|
| 1773-1777 | Filippo Beccari |
| 1778-1783 | Leopold Paradise |
| 1783-1805 | Cosimo Morelli (choreographer) |
| 1806-1808 | Jean Lamiral |
| 1808-1811 | Dominique Lefèvre |
| 1811-1839 | Adam Glushkovskiy |
| 1839-1846 | Konstantin Bordanov (ru: Богданов, Константин Федорович) |
| 1846-1850 | Feodor Manokhin (ru: Манохин, Фёдор Николаевич) |
| 1851-1857 | N/A |
| 1858-1869 | Feodor Manokhin (ru: Манохин, Фёдор Николаевич) |
| 1869-1872 | Pierre Frédéric Malavergne |
| 1872-1874 | Gustave Legat |
| 1874-1883 | Sergey Petrovich Sokolov (ru: Соколов, Сергей Петрович) |
| 1883-1898 | Aleksey Bogdanov (ru: Богданов, Алексей Николаевич) |
| 1898-1902 | Vasiliy Geltser (ru: Гельцер, Василий Федорович) |
| 1902-1907 | Alexander Alexeyevich Gorsky |
| 1907-1917 | Vasily Tikhomirov (ru: Тихомиров, Василий Дмитриевич) |
| 1917-1924 | Alexander Alexeyevich Gorsky |
| 1924-1931 | N/A |
| 1931-1936 | Viktor Aleksandrovich Semeonov (ru: Семёнов, Виктор Александрович) |
| 1937-1941 | Pyotr Gusev |
| 1942-1945 | Nikolay Ivanovich Tarasov (ru: Тарасов, Николай Иванович) |
| 1945-1947 | Rostislav Zakharov |
| 1948-1953 | Leonid Lavrovsky |
| 1953-1954 | Nikolay Ivanovich Tarasov |
| 1954-1958 | Michail Gabovich (ru: Габович, Михаил Маркович) |
| 1959-1964 | Yuriy Kondratov (ru: Кондратов, Юрий Григорьевич) |
| 1960-2001 | Sofia Golovkina (ru: Головкина, Софья Николаевна) |
| 1964-1967 | Leonid Lavrovsky |
| 1968-1972 | Aleksey Yermolayev |
| 1973-1987 | Maksim Martirosian (ru: Мартиросян, Максим Саакович) |
| 1988-1993 | Igor Uksusnikov (ru: Уксусников, Игорь Валентинович) |
| 2001-2002 | Boris Akimov (ru: Акимов, Борис Борисович) |
| 2002-2024 | Marina Leonova (ru: Леонова, Марина Константиновна) |
| 2024-Present | Svetlana Zakharova |

== Method and education ==
The Bolshoi's method of teaching is founded on a Russian training curriculum that is coordinated to the student's ability. This curriculum, commonly known as the Vaganova method, is widely adopted by ballet schools around the world. The curriculum focuses on ballet technique, pointe work, center work, repertoire, pas de deux, jazz, character dance, and historical dance.

== Facilities ==
Amenities at the Bolshoi Ballet Academy include twenty large studios with a professional non-slip dance floor. High ceilings make it possible to offer pas de deux classes, and two levels of ballet barres are provided for young children and adults.

== Alumni ==
The Bolshoi is the school from which the Bolshoi Ballet receives the majority of its dancers, as well as most other Moscow ballet companies. The academy has graduated a long list of acclaimed ballerinas and danseurs, including:

- Maria Alexandrova
- Alexander Andrianov
- Nina Ananiashvili
- Dmitry Belogolovtsev
- Natalia Bessmertnova
- Margarita Drozdova
- Nikolai Fadeyechev
- Sergei Filin
- Yekaterina Geltzer
- Nadezhda Gracheva
- Dmitry Gudanov
- Nina Kaptsova
- Maria Kochetkova
- Marina Kondratyeva
- Ekaterina Krysanova
- Mikhail Lavrovsky
- Olga Lepeshinskaya
- Ilze Liepa
- Andris Liepa
- Maris Liepa
- Svetlana Lunkina
- Vladimir Malakhov
- Xenia Makletzova
- Ekaterina Maximova
- Elina Melnichenko
- Asaf Messerer
- Alla Mikhalchenko
- Igor Moiseyev
- Mikhail Mordkin
- Irek Mukhamedov
- Anastasia Nabokina
- Natalia Osipova
- Maya Plisetskaya
- Alexander Plisetski
- Polina Semionova
- Ruslan Skvortsov
- Nina Sorokina
- Galina Stepanenko
- Raisa Struchkova
- Vasily Tikhomirov
- Nikolai Tsiskaridze
- Vladimir Vasiliev
- Andrey Uvarov

== Summer intensive ==
The academy partners with the Russian American Foundation to hold annual summer intensives at Lincoln Center in New York City and in Middlebury, CT.

== Former names ==
Throughout its history, the school has changed its name several times. Below is a table about the history of its former names.

| Period | Name in Russian | Name in English |
|---|---|---|
| 1773-1806 | Классы театрального танцевания | Theatrical dance classes |
| 1806-1920 | Московское императорское училище | Moscow Imperial School |
| 1920-1931 | Государственный московский балетный техникум при ГАБТ | State Moscow Ballet College at the Bolshoi Theater |
| 1937-1961 | Московское академическое училище (МАХУ) | Choreographic School of the Bolshoi Theater |
| 1961-1987 | Московский государственный хореографический (институт с сохранением при нём МАХУ) | Moscow State Choreographic Institute (with the preservation of MAKhU) |
| 1987- | Московская государственная академия хореографии (МГАХ) | Moscow State Academy of Choreography |
