= Lorca Massine =

American ballet dancer and choreographer

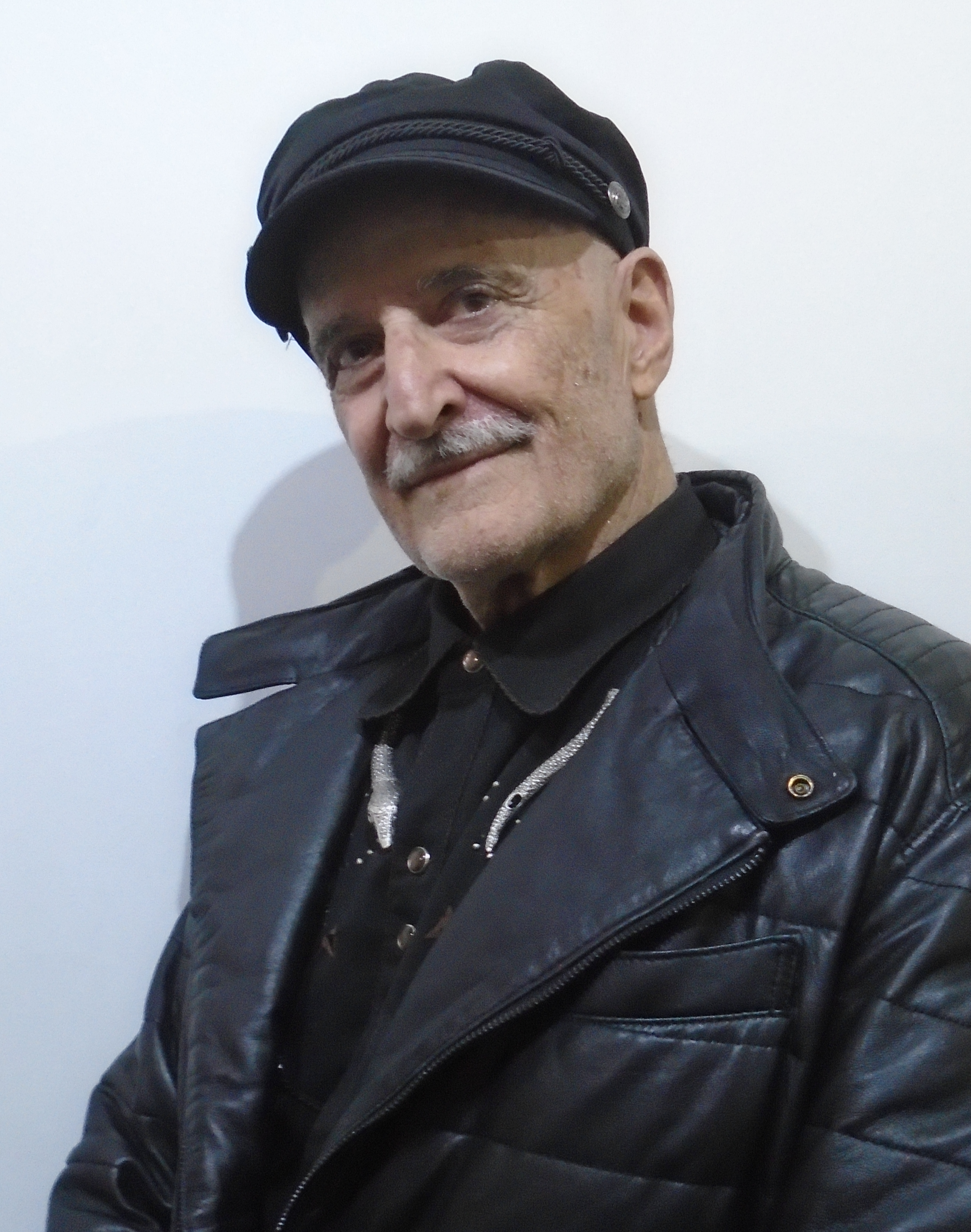
- Born: 25 July 1944 (age 82); New York City, U.S.
- Occupations: Choreographer; ballet dancer
- Parent: Léonide Massine (father)

Lorca Massine is an American choreographer and dancer, born in New York on July 25, 1944, to Russian immigrant Léonide Massine, an accomplished choreographer and dancer. He studied dance with his father, Victor Gsovsky, Asaf Messerer and Anatole Wilzac. Over his career, he has collaborated with world-acclaimed choreographers such as Balanchine, Béjart, as well as his father.

== Repertoire ==
Massine's works have been performed by companies such as the Birmingham Royal Ballet, New York City Ballet, American Ballet Theatre, Béjart's Ballet of the Twentieth Century and the Paris Opera Ballet. His works have also been performed at venues such as the Metropolitan Opera (New York), Teatro alla Scala (Milan), Teatro la Fenice (Venice), Teatro San Carlo (Naples), Teatro dell'Opera (Rome), Teatro Massimo (Palermo), Teatro Carlo Felice (Genoa), the Royal Opera House at Covent Garden (London), and the Arena di Verona.

== Zorba ==
Like his father, Massine presents contemporary themes in dance based on the classical background. He has created more than fifty ballet choreographies and musical works. His breakthrough work Zorba was premiered at the Arena of Verona in 1988 and has since been seen in roughly forty countries.

== Directorships ==
- Director, Ballet of Opera of Rome, 1981-1983
- Director, Ballet of the Polish National Opera (Warsaw), 1992-1994

== Staging the works of Léonide Massine ==
Lorca Massine is also known for setting his father's choreographic works on contemporary stages, including the Paris Opera, the Birmingham Royal Ballet, American Ballet Theatre, the Pennsylvania Ballet, Les Grands Ballets Canadiens, the Royal Winnipeg Ballet, Bavarian State Ballet, the Boston Ballet and Vienna State Ballet. In 2005, three ballets of Léonide Massine became part of the repertoire of the Bolshoi Ballet.

As the reviver of his father's ballets, he staged the following works:

- Choreartium
- Gaieté Parisienne
- La Boutique Fantasque
- La Symphonie Fantastique
- Laudes Evangelii (12th century music orchestrated by V. Buchi)
- Les Presages
- The Rite of Spring
- The Picasso Ballets: Le Tricorne, Mercure, Parade and Pulcinella

== Works ==
=== Full-length Ballets ===
- Ondine (Henze/La Motte Fouquet)
- Mario and the Magician (Thomas Mann/Visconti/Manino)
- Esotérik Satie (Erik Satie, piano music)
- Fortepianissimo (F. Chopin)
- Streets (the Musical)
- La metamorphose (Franz Kafka; Berlioz)
- Zorba (Kazantzakis/Theodorakis)
- Undine (Hans Werner Henze)
- Fortepianissimo (F. Chopin)
- The Rite of Spring (Igor Stravinsky)

=== One-Act Ballet ===
- Four Last Songs (Richard Strauss)
- Sebastian (Giancarlo Menotti)
- The song of the Nightingale (Andersen/Depero/Stravinsky)
- La colonie penitentiaire (Kafka, Mayuzumi)
- Ode (Igor Stravinsky)
- 10th Symphony (Gustav Mahler)
- Mercure (Satie, Picasso)
- Jack in the box (Derain, Milhaud)
- Fantaisie Serieuse (Erik Satie)
