= Ekaterina Maximova =

Russian ballet dancer

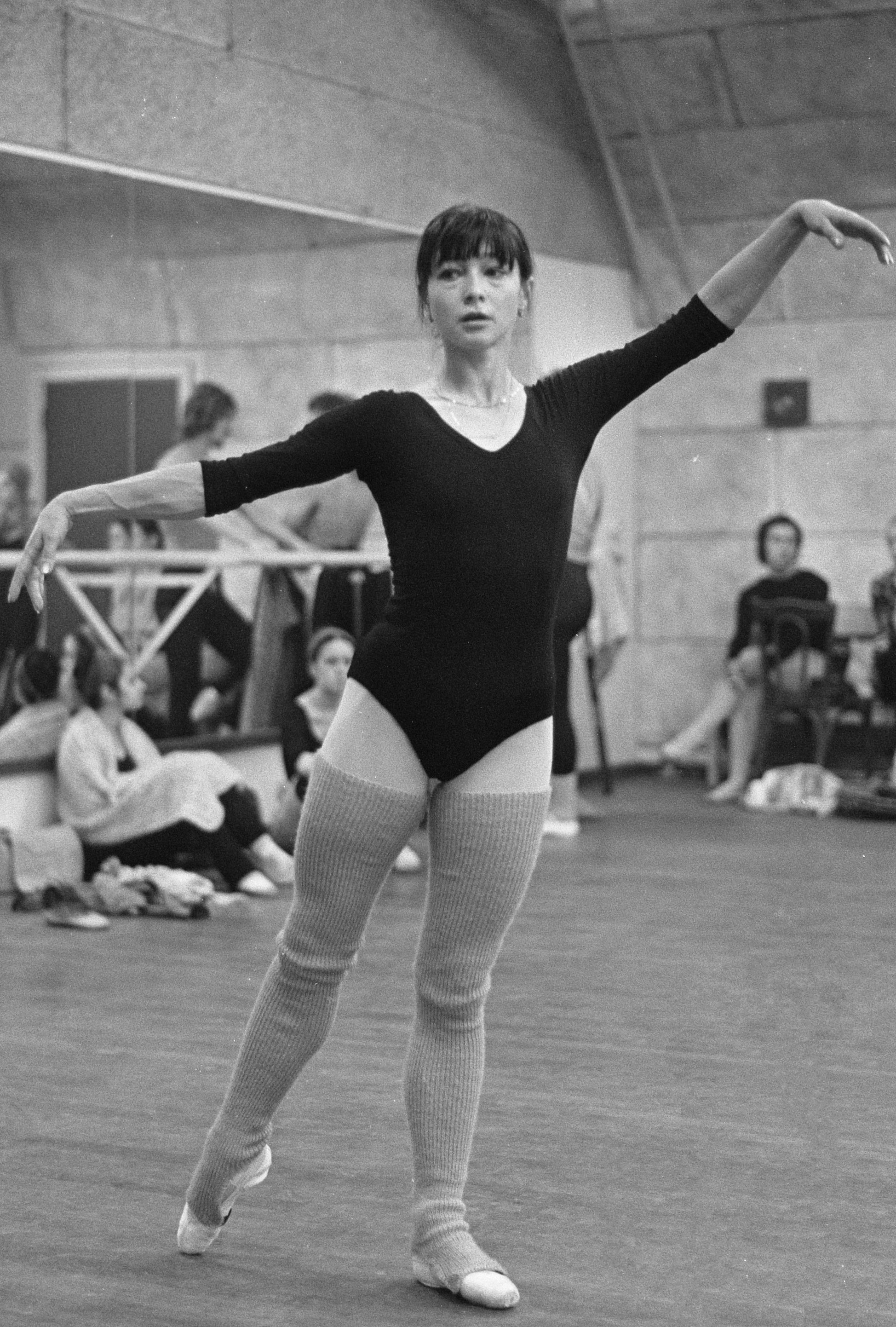
- Maximova in 1972
- Born: Ekaterina Sergeyevna Maximova; February 1, 1939; Moscow, Soviet Union
- Died: April 28, 2009 (aged 70); Moscow, Russia
- Occupations: Ballet dancer, teacher
- Years active: 1958–2009
- Spouse: Vladimir Vasiliev
- Partner: Vladimir Vasiliev

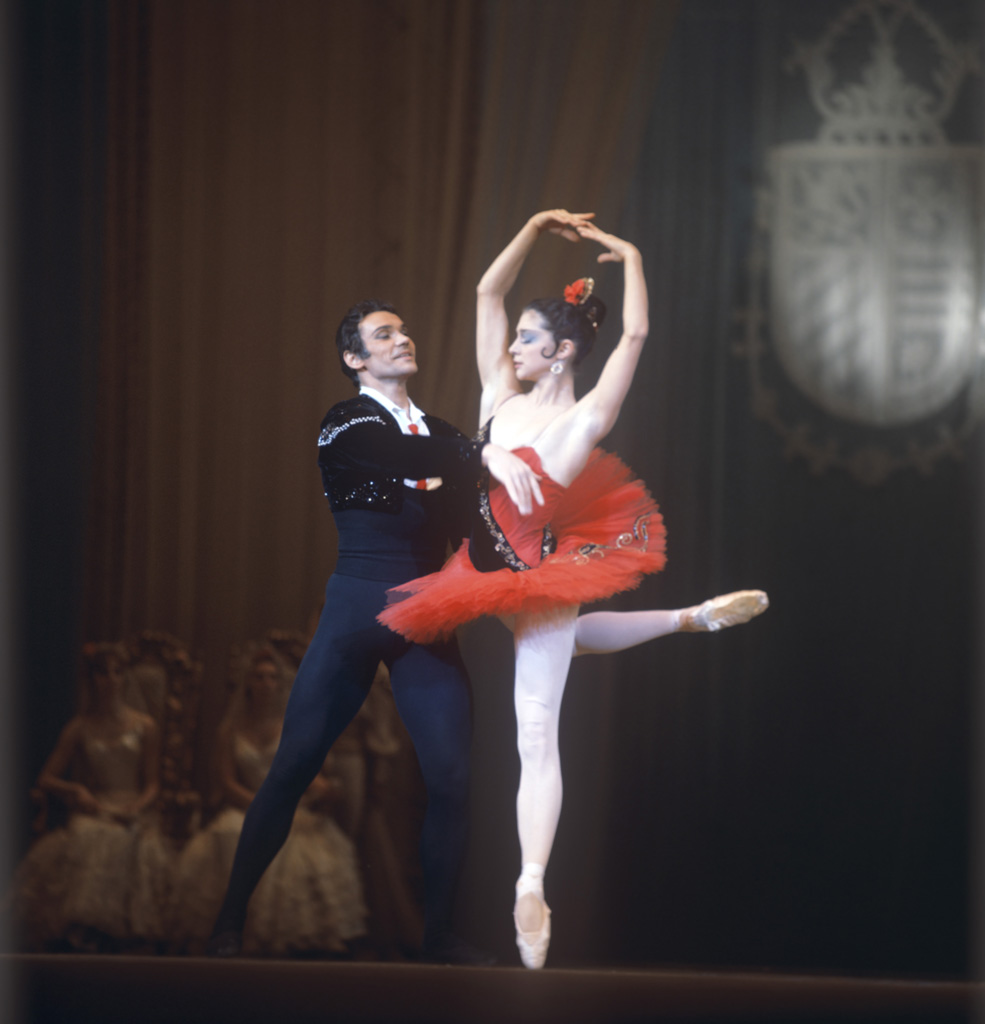
Maximova as Kitri and her husband Vladimir Vasiliev as Basilio in Don Quixote at the Bolshoi Theatre. (c. 1970)

Ekaterina Sergeyevna Maximova (Russian: Екатерина Сергеевна Максимова; 1 February 1939 – 28 April 2009) was a Soviet and Russian ballerina of the second part of the 20th century who was internationally recognised. She was a prima ballerina of the Bolshoi Theatre for 30 years, a ballet pedagogue, winner of international ballet competitions, Laureate of many prestigious International and Russian awards, a professor in GITIS, Honorary professor at the Moscow State University, Academician of the Russian Academy of Arts, and an Executive Committee member of the Russian Center of Counseil International De La Danse, UNESCO.

== Early life ==
Maximova was born in Moscow on 1 February 1939 to a highly educated family. Her maternal grandfather was Gustav Shpet, a Russian philosopher, historian of philosophy, psychologist, art theoretician, and interpreter (he knew 17 languages) of German-Polish descent. Her mother Tatiana Maximova (née Shpet) was a journalist and publishing house editor and her father Sergey Maximov was an engineer.

She was admitted to Moscow Ballet School (now Moscow Ballet Academy) and the age of 10 and the same year as her future partner and husband Vladimir Vasiliev. Their ballet partnership started at school.

Former ballerina of the Mariinsky Theater Elizaveta Gerdt was Maximova's instructor at the ballet school. Maximova graduated from the Moscow ballet school in 1958 and joined Bolshoi Ballet the same year. She won first prize at the National Ballet competition in 1957 while still a ballet student.

== Career ==
In the Bolshoi Theater

Maximova's first ballet as a Bolshoi ballet dancer was The Stone Flower (in the leading role of Katerina). Her performance was so impressive that she was chosen to go on the first Bolshoi tour in the US in 1959. The American press called her "a little elf" and complemented her technique, grace and artistic style even though legendary Galina Ulanova was the real sensation of that tour. Later Ulanova became Maximova's ballet coach in the Bolshoi for many years.

In 1961, as a young ballerina Maximova starred along with Vladimir Vasiliev in the film for European and American viewers The USSR with an Open Heart, where they played ballet dancers. The premiere took place in Paris where Maximova and Vasiliev arrived as newlyweds.

According to ballet professionals, Maximova possessed ideal ballet body lines, effortless jumps and spins and flawless technical clarity. She started as a lyrical ballerina dancing title roles in classical ballets Giselle, Nutcracker (Marie), Fountain of Bakhchisarai (Maria), Cinderella and Sleeping Beauty (Aurora), but extended her breathtaking artistic talent and technical virtuosity through her hard work and devotion to her art. This enabled her to widen her artistic range with playful Kitri (Don Quixote), comic Eliza Doolittle (Galatea) and dramatic roles of Juliet, Phrigia (Spartacus), Anyuta (Chekov's story "Anna on the neck") Tatiana (Onegin) that tested her dramatic skills as an actress most completely.

Maximova seriously injured her spine during a rehearsal in 1975 and some doctors did not believe that she would walk again, but she returned on the stage in 1976.

She was known to decline roles she felt unable to perform, which earned her the sobriquet "Madame No". She did this because she did not believe in herself and her skills. She always questioned herself if she was good enough to dance even better than before. She had a very few interviews in her entire life and always stressed that she was a hardworking ballerina permanently trying to improve her skills. She could keep a very high level of performance and youthful dancing style through her 40-year career In 2003 she wrote her autobiography and named it "Madame No".

Maximova danced many duets with Vladimir Vasiliev, who is regarded by some as one of the greatest male dancers of all time. They took part in numerous Bolshoi ballet tours in USA, Canada, Austria, Belgium, Denmark, France, Great Britain, Italy, Netherlands, Australia, Argentina, Japan, and dozens of other countries in the world as well as in a Kirov Ballet (now Mariinsky Ballet) tour in Paris, France. She was one of the Bolshoi stars who danced in the last program presented at the old Metropolitan Opera House on Thirty-ninth Street and Broadway on 8 May 1966. Maximova and Vasiliev started dancing abroad as guest stars in 1978. Fortunately, many of their performances have been preserved on film and prove a lasting testament to one of the greatest ballet partnerships in the history of dance. Among her other ballet partners were M. Liepa, M. Lavrovsky, and A. Bogatyrev.

She last performed on the ballet stage in 1999.

Ballet achievements with other ballet companies

Maximova was invited to work with famous contemporary choreographers including Maurice Béjart, Roland Petit, Kasyan Goleizovsky, Pierre Lacotte, Gerald Arpino, Tom Schilling, Martha Clarke, Lorca Massine and appeared in their ballet productions and ballet excerpts for gala concert performances.

She also started dancing in Moscow Classical Ballet productions in 1980 where she performed the title role in Pierre Lacotte's Nathalie and roles of Juliet in Romeo and Juliet, and Eve in the Creation of the World. She danced the title role in Cinderella in the Kremlin Ballet choreographed by her husband, Vladimir Vasiliev who also choreographed a great number of ballet compositions for her through her career.

Maximova graduated from GITIS (now The Russian Academy of Theater Arts) in 1980 with a diploma of ballet master and started teaching classical choreography and dance composition there in 1982 while she was still dancing in the Bolshoi Theater.

After retiring from the Bolshoi Theater as a prima ballerina in 1988, Maximova continued dancing the role of Anyuta at the Bolshoi through 1994 and in addition she had more opportunities to tour and to work for other Russian ballet troupes and ballet companies abroad as a guest star for following 10 years performing some classical ballets with new choreography and modern ballets that did not appear in the Bolshoi repertoire.

Throughout her career she danced on the famous stages in the world such as Covent Garden (London), Grand Opera (Paris), La Scala (Milan), Metropolitan Opera (New York), Rome Opera (Rome), Teatro Colón (Buenos Aires) and performed with international ballet companies Maurice Bejart's The 20th Century Ballet (Belgium) (1977–1978), St. Carlo Theater (Italy) (1986, 1988–1989) Roland Petit's Ballet National de Marseille (France) (1987) English National Ballet (Great Britain) (1989), American Ballet Theatre (USA) (1990) National Ballet of Canada (1993) and others.

Ballet pedagogical and professional activities

In 1990 she started coaching the leading soloists in ballet roles in the Kremlin Ballet (such as N. Balakhnicheva, T. Predeina, Z. Bogoroditskaya) and in 1996 with the Bolshoi Ballet (such as G. Stepanenko, S. Lunkina, M. Ryzhkina, A. Nukulina) along with teaching in GITIS where she became a professor in 1996.

Maximova and Vasiliev were the founding organizers for the Arabesque ballet competition in Perm, Russia in 1990 and established their prize for "The best duet" there in 1992. She was a jury member at Arabesque through 2008.

Maximova taught masterclasses throughout the world, served as a member of various committees and councils for creative arts in Russia and abroad and was invited to be a jury member at ballet competitions (the Chairman of the jury in 5th International Ballet competition "Premia Rome", Italy and Arabesque ballet competition 1996–2008, Russia, and the juror of the ballet competitions in Jackson USA, Paris France, Lausanne Switzerland, Nagoya Japan, Seoul Korea and others).

While Vasiliev was the Bolshoi Theater director, he and Maximova took an active part in opening the first (outside Moscow) Bolshoi Theater ballet school in Joinville, Brazil in 2000. Both of them were awarded the highest Brazilian awards in 2004.

Her last ballet performance was at the gala dedicated to her 60th birthday on 1 February 1999 in the Bolshoi Theater.

Over the years, Maximova has received many of the most prestigious Soviet, Russian and foreign prizes, orders, medals and highest awards of the countries.

She appeared in a great number of Russian movies, video ballet productions, TV ballet and musical films as well as in international ones. Several TV ballet films were made for her by the movie director A. Belinsky (Galatea, Old Tango, Anyuta, Chapliniana) Maximova's art of dance was an inspiration for several ballets, movies, documentaries, books and even poems. She and her husband also gained wide exposure for their appearances in Franco Zeffirelli's filmed version of Giuseppe Verdi's opera La Traviata (1982). Both performed in Spanish costumes in the divertissements composed for the equivalent of Act II, scene 2.

== Ballet roles ==
Selected ballet roles in the Bolshoi Theater (the first interpreter* and the first interpreter in the Bolshoi **)

- Katerina in The Stone Flower, S. Prokofiev, choreography Grigorovich (1959)**
- Prelude and Waltz in Chopiniana, F. Chopin, choreography Fokine (1960)
- Title role in Giselle A. Adam, choreography Coralli/Perrot/Petipa (1960)
- Jeanne in Flames of Paris, B. Asafyev, choreography Vainonen (1961)
- Muse in Paganini, S. Rachmaninov, choreography Lavrovsky (1962)
- Masha in The Nutcracker, P. Tchaikovsky, choreography Vainonen (1962)
- Maria in The Fountain of Bakhchisarai, B. Asafyev, choreography Zakharov (1962)
- Bacchante in Walpurgis Night, C. Gounod choreography Lavrovsky (1962)
- Florina in The Sleeping Beauty, P. Tchaikovsky, choreography Petipa/Grigorovich (1963)**
- Soloist in variation in School of Ballet, D. Shostakovich, A Glazunov, choreography Messerer (1963)*
- Title role in Cinderella, S. Prokofiev, choreography Zakharov (1964)
- Aurora in The Sleeping Beauty, P. Tchaikovsky, choreography Petipa/Grigorovich (1964) revised choreography Petipa/ Grigorovich (1973)**
- Ballerina in Petrushka, I. Stravinsky, choreography Fokine/Boyarsky (1964)**
- Kitri in Don Quixote, L. Minkus, choreography Gorsky (1965)
- Masha in The Nutcracker, P. Tchaikovsky, choreography Grigorovich (1966)**
- Phrygia in Spartacus, A. Khachaturian, choreography Grigorovich (1968)*
- Young girl in Le Spectre de la Rose, C. Weber, choreography Fokine (1968)
- Odette/Odile in Swan Lake, P. Tchaikovsky, choreography Petipa/Ivanov/Gorsky (1968)
- Young girl in Icarus, S. Slonimsky, choreography Vasiliev (1971)* Aoela (revised choreography) (1976)*
- Juliet in Romeo and Juliet, S. Prokofiev, choreography Lavrovsky (1973)
- Soloist in Those Charming Sounds, A. Corelli, G. Torelli, V. Mozart, choreography Vasiliev (1978)*
- Shoura Azarova in The Hussar's Ballad, T. Khrennikov, choreography Briantzev (1980)*
- Title role in Anyuta, V. Gavrilin, choreography Vasiliev (1986)*

Leading ballet roles with other ballet companies (first interpreter in Russia*)

- Match Pas de deux choreography T. Schilling (1972)*
- Juliet in Romeo and Juliet H. Berlioz, choreography M. Béjart (with Ballet of the 20th Century) (1977–1978)*
- Pas de deux from Sylvia L. Delibes, choreography F. Ashton (at M. Liepa's gala) (1979)*
- Title role in Nathalie A. Gyrowetz, choreography P. Taglioni/P. Lacotte (with Moscow Classical Ballet) (1980) *
- Juliet in Romeo and Juliet S. Prokofiev choreography Kasatkina/Vasilyov (with Moscow Classical Ballet) (1981)
- Eve in The Creation of the World A. Petrov, choreography Kasatkina/Vasilyov (with Moscow Classical Ballet) (1981)
- Rose in Blue Angel M. Constant, choreography R. Petit (with Ballet de Marseille) (1987)*
- Glove seller in Gaieté Parisienne J. Offenbach choreography L. Massine (St. Carlo Theater, Naples) (1988)*
- Tatiana in Onegin P. Tchaikovsky choreography J. Cranko (with English National Ballet) (1989)*
- Romola in Nijinsky selected music by various composers, director B. Menegatti choreography V.Vasiliev) (St. Carlo Theater, Naples) (1989)*
- Title role in Cinderella S. Prokofiev, choreography V.Vasiliev (with Kremlin Ballet) (1991)*
- Girl in Round of Angels G. Mahler, choreography G. Arpino (1994)*
- Soloist in The Gardens of Villandry, F. Schubert choreography M. Clarke (1999)*

== Awards and honors ==
Ballet, Theater and Film awards

- 1957 Gold medal All-Union Ballet competition Moscow, USSR
- 1959 1st prize and Gold medal VII International Youth Festival Vienna, Austria
- 1964 1st prize 1st Varna International Ballet Competition, Bulgaria
- 1969 Anna Pavlova Prize "The Best Dancer of the World" from Paris Dance Academy, France
- 1972 Marius Petipa Prize "The Best Duet of the World" with Vladimir Vasiliev from Paris Dance Academy, France
- 1980 InterVision Prize for the best actress in the leading role for TV film "Old tango" at International Festival "Zlata Praha", Czechoslovakia
- 1984 Premio SIMBA, Accademia SIMBA, Italy
- 1984 Vasilyev Brothers State Prize of the RSFSR for the leading role in TV film-ballet "Anyuta"
- 1989 Gino Tani Prize for the Art of Dance (Premio Internazionale Gino Tani, Italy) for "The Best Duet" with Vladimir Vasiliev
- 1990 Sergey Dyagilev Prize, Russia
- 1993 Leonide Massine Prize for Art of Dance (Positano Premia la Danza Leonide Massine), Italy
- 1993 Crystal Turandot Award for theater arts with Vladimir Vasiliev (Golden Duet) Russia

Honorary Soviet, Russian and International awards

- 1964 Honored Artist of the RSFSR
- 1969 People's Artist of the RSFSR
- 1971 Order of the Red Banner of Labour, USSR
- 1973 People's Artist of the USSR
- 1976 Order of Lenin, USSR
- 1981 Order of Friendship of Peoples, USSR
- 1981 USSR State Prize
- 1989 Member of International Academy of Creative Endeavors- Russian Section
- 1990 UNESCO Pablo Picasso Medal
- 1990 Member of the Executive Committee of Counseil International De La Danse, UNESCO (International Dance Council)
- 1991 Glinka State Prize of the RSFSR
- 1992 -2009 Jury member for Russian Independent Theater Award "Triumph"
- 1994 Second Order of Friendship of Peoples, Russia
- 1995 Honorary Professor, Moscow State University, Russia
- 1995 Academician of the Russian Academy of Arts
- 1999 Order "For Merit to the Fatherland", 3rd class
- 2004 Order of Rio Branco, Brazil
- 2004 Soul of Dance Award, Russian Magazine "Ballet"
- 2008 Order "For Merit to the Fatherland", 4th class

== Film, television and books ==
List of leading roles in full length ballet videos

- 1970 Phrigia in Spartacus, A. Khachaturian, choreography Grogorovich, Bolshoi Theater
- 1974 Juliet in Romeo and Juliet, S. Prokofiev choreography, Lavrovsky, Bolshoi Theater
- 1978 Masha in Nutcracker, P. Tchaikovsky, choreography Grigorovich, Bolshoi Theater
- 1978 Katerina in the Stone Flower, S. Prokofiev, choreography Grigorovich, Bolshoi Theater
- 1987 Masha in Nutcracker, P. Tchaikovsky, choreography Grigorovich, Bolshoi Theater
- 1994 Title role in Cinderella, S. Prokofiev, choreography Vasiliev, Kremlin Ballet

Leading roles in movies

Documentaries and books about Ekaterina Maximova

- N Avaliani, L Jdanov. Bolshoi's young dancers, p.60-107 (London, Central books 1975)
- S. Montague. Pas de Deux, p. 93-97 (N-Y., Universe books 1981)
- M. Konstantinova. Ekaterina Maximova (M., Iskusstvo 1982)
- G. Smakov. The Great Russian Dancers, p. 180-185 (N-Y., Knopt 1984)
- Katia et Volodia, documentary, director D. Delouche, Les Films du Prieure, Paris, France 1989
- R. Lazzarini. Maximova & Vasiliev at the Bolshoi, photo album (London: Dance Books, 1995)
- Katya, documentary, director N. Tikhonov, Bolshoi Theater video studio, Russia, 1999
- E. Fetisova Ekaterina Maximova Vladimir Vasiliev, photo album (М., 1999)
- Katya. A letter from the past, documentary, director V. Vasiliev, Russia-K, Russia, 2019

== Personal life ==
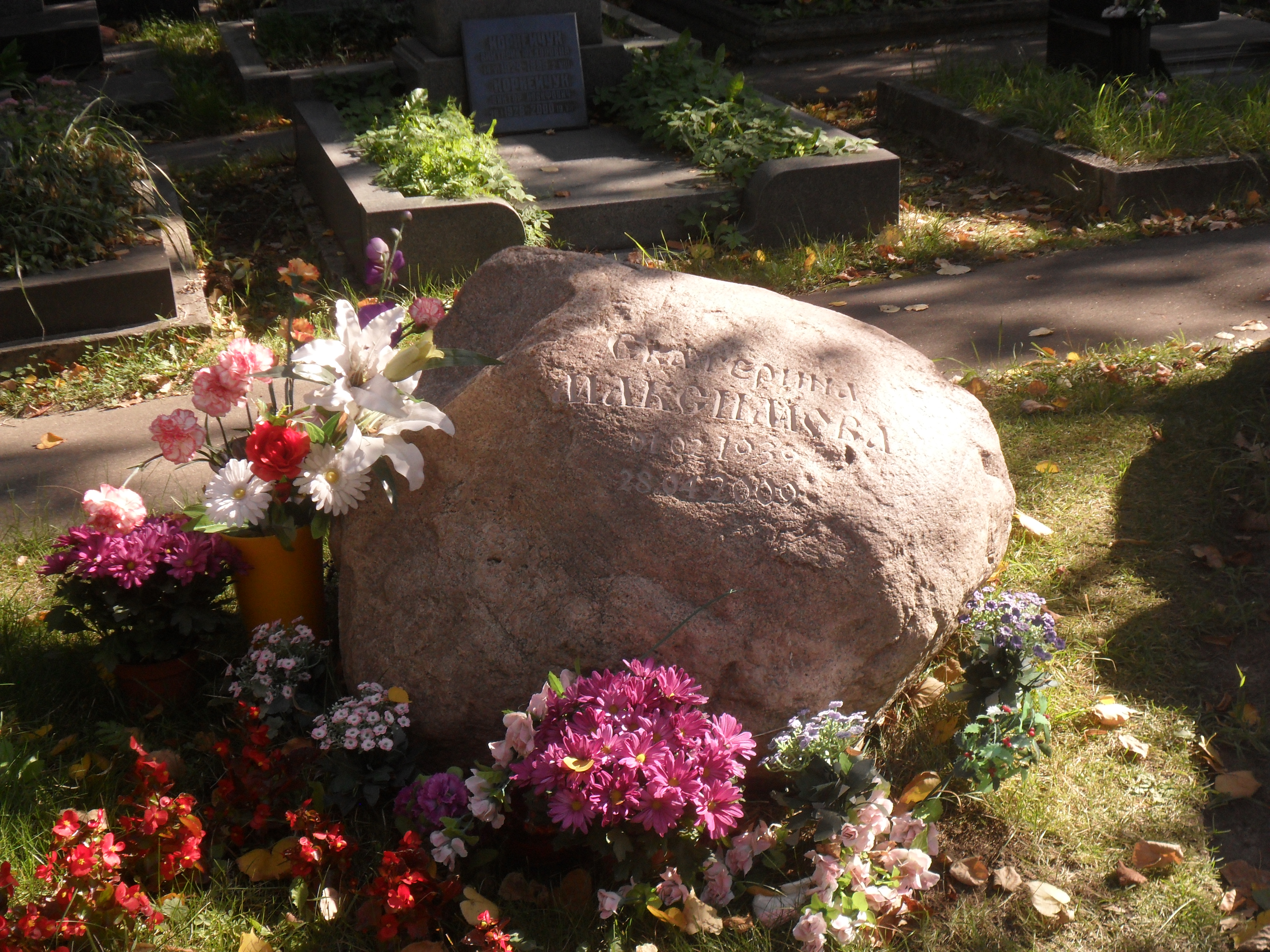
Maksimova’s grave at Novodevichy Cemetery.

Maximova was married to Vladimir Vasiliev for almost 50 years. They had no children.

She died of heart failure on 28 April 2009, at the age of 70.

== See also ==
- List of Russian ballet dancers

== Obituaries ==
- Daily Telegraph, 28 April 2009
