= Vladimir Vasiliev (dancer) =

Russian ballet dancer

- Владимир Васильев
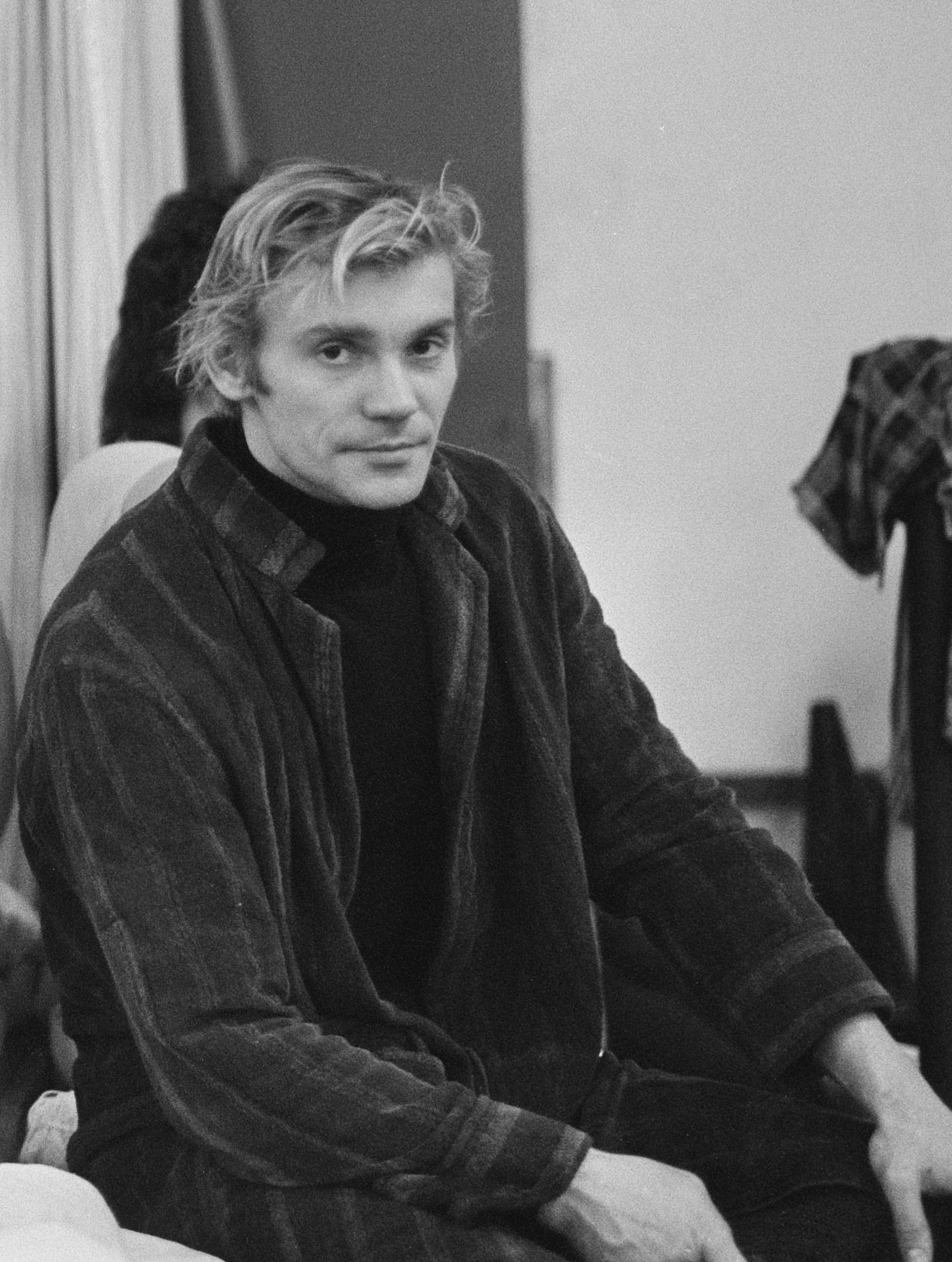
- Vasiliev in 1972
- Born: Vladimir Viktorovich Vasiliev; 18 April 1940 (age 86); Moscow, Russian SFSR, Soviet Union
- Education: Moscow Ballet School
- Occupations: Principal dancer; Ballet director; Choreographer
- Spouse: Ekaterina Maximova (m. 1961; died 2009)
- Dancing career
- Former groups: Bolshoi Ballet

Vladimir Viktorovich Vasiliev (Russian: Владимир Викторович Васильев; born 18 April 1940) is a Russian ballet dancer and choreographer. He was a principal dancer with the Bolshoi Ballet and its director from 1995 to 2000. He was best known for his role of Spartacus and his powerful leaps and turns. He received the People's Artist of the USSR (1973).

Vasiliev was named "God of the dance" and is regarded as a classical dancer on the same level as Rudolf Nureyev, Erik Bruhn and Mikhail Baryshnikov. At the height of their careers, Vasiliev and Ekaterina Maximova were the golden couple of Russian ballet.

== Early life ==
Vasiliev was born in Moscow in 1940, the son of a mechanical engineer. In 1947 he joined the amateur ballet group of the Kirov pioneer group, where he stayed two years. His first teacher was Elena Romanovna Rosse.

He entered the Moscow Ballet School, commonly known as The Bolshoi Ballet Academy, in 1949 and graduated in 1958. His teachers at the Moscow Ballet School included Aleksey Yermolayev.

== Career ==
=== Principal Dancer with the Bolshoi Ballet ===
1958 he entered the Bolshoi Ballet and became a principal dancer in 1959. There he received further training and guidance from the renowned ballet masters Alexei Yermolayev, Asaf Messerer, and later Galina Ulanova.

=== Career with Ekaterina Maximova ===
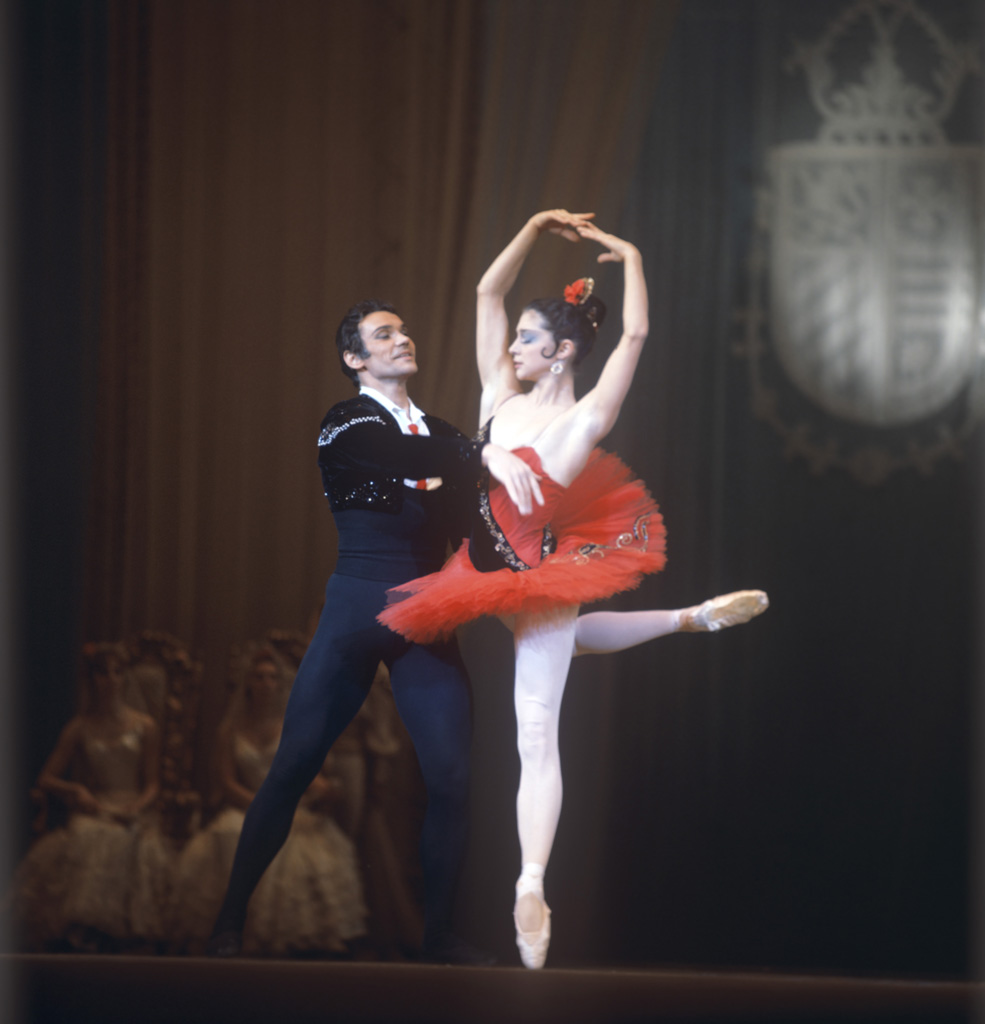
Vasiliev as Basilio with his wife Ekaterina Maximova as Kitri in Don Quixote at the Bolshoi Theatre, 1970

Vasiliev and Ekaterina Maximova, both principal dancers, were the dream couple of the Bolshoi Ballet. Dancing as a pair for the first time in 1949 as classmates at the Moscow Ballet School, they were married in 1961.

New York Times dance critic Anna Kisselgoff described the excitement of one of Vasiliev's United States performances with the Bolshoi Ballet: "Yekaterina Maksimova and Vladimir Vasiliev burst upon New York City in 1959, the greatest of the passionate young dancers who, with Moscow's more established stars, made the Bolshoi Ballet's American debut a total triumph."

The Bolshoi tour to London in 1969 was dominated by the sensational impact of Aram Khachaturian's ballet Spartacus as choreographed by Yury Grigorovich, in which, wrote the leading critic Richard Buckle, "Maximova would melt any tyrant's heart".

The great male dancer Mikhail Baryshnikov paid tribute to the couple, saying Maximova, with her "elegant build, beauty, virtuosity and even more so her spontaneity and sincerity", was treated like a "rare treasure" by the indomitable Vasiliev. This gave their performances an almost sacred aura, to which audiences gratefully responded.

Vasiliev and Ekaterina Maximova gleaned wide exposure for their appearances in Franco Zeffirelli's filmed version of Giuseppe Verdi's opera La traviata of 1983. Both performed in Spanish costume, Vasiliev as a matador, in the "divertissements" composed for the equivalent of Act II, scene 2.

The couple was filmed in 1988 by French director Dominique Delouche in a film portrait “Katia et Volodia".

In 2008, the Bolshoi hosted a week-long festival dedicated to Maximova and Vasiliev's 50 years on the Bolshoi stage, during which Vasiliev commented that the secret of partnering was "the man must not get in the way of the woman – she is the most important person on stage." He added that all his life his wife had been his inspiration for two qualities: her beauty and her capacity for hard work.

The marriage lasted for nearly 50 years, until Maximova died in 2009. They had no children.

=== Director of the Bolshoi ballet ===
In March 1995, Vasiliev was appointed the general and artistic director of the Bolshoi Theatre after Yury Grigorovich, artistic director of the ballet company since 1963, was dismissed by Russian president Boris Yeltsin.

Among the major projects Vasiliev has spearheaded there were such as the large scale exchange of Bolshoi and Mariinsky Ballet companies in 1998, of the Bolshoi and Paris Opera Ballet to be held, first-ever New Year Ball in the Bolshoi on 31 December 1999, foundation of the International Club of the Bolshoi Friends.

At the end of the 1990s, he was one of the first ballet directors who recognized the class and the outstanding qualities of Svetlana Zakharova, then principal dancer with the Mariinsky ballet. Svetlana Zakharova became a principal dancer with the Bolshoi Ballet in October 2003.

Vasiliev was dismissed as director of the Bolshoi Theater on 28 August 2000. He learned about his dismissal from hearing it on the radio.

=== Career after the Bolshoi Theatre ===
After his tenure as Artistic Director of the Bolshoi Theatre, Vladimir Vasiliev continued his career primarily as a choreographer and stage director. He created and staged new ballet productions in Russia and abroad, working with companies such as the Teatro dell’Opera di Roma and other international theatres. He also appeared in guest capacities as a teacher, jury member, and artistic advisor within the ballet world and is maintaining an ongoing presence in the Russian and international ballet community.

== Legacy ==
Vasiliev is not as well known in the west as other iconic male dancers such as Rudolf Nureyev and Mikhail Baryshnikov, because he remained in the Soviet Union and did most of his work there. Nevertheless, his work as a classical dancer is regarded on the same level as both Nureyev and Baryshnikov. Mathias Heymann, who was promoted to principal dancer with the Paris Opera Ballet in 2009 at only 22 years old, told in an interview that he takes inspiration from watching videos of Rudolf Nureyev, whom he regards as his role model, along with Vasiliev and Baryshnikov.

Russia's influential ballet critic and choreographer Fyodor Lopukhov called Vasiliev "God of the dance" and "A miracle in art, perfection".

== Performance style ==
=== On stage ===
Numerous roles were created for Vasiliev, and he performed throughout the world, usually partnering his wife. Among the most notable were those created by Yury Grigorovich, who gave him the principal roles in his original productions of The Tale of the Stone Flower, Spartacus, The Nutcracker, the ballet version of Ivan the Terrible, Valery Gavrilin's Anyuta (1982), and Yakov Eshpai's Angara (1976). Besides Maximova, Vasiliev's famous partners included Galina Ulanova, Maya Plisetskaya, Alicia Alonso, Carla Fracci, Rita Poelvoorde and Ambra Vallo.

=== Style ===
Having a body revealing great physical strength, Vasiliev did not embody the ideal physical form for a classical dancer.

He made enormous contributions to the development of classical male dance, embodying the strong new Bolshoi male.

"You see — at the beginning we do things only as we have seen them done," said Vasiliev at the end of Katia et Volodia, the 1988 film exploring Vasiliev's artistry and that of his wife and fellow Bolshoi luminary, Ekaterina Maximova. "Afterwards, we do them with what we find inside ourselves."

== Honours and awards ==
Vasiliev is the first dancer to be given the award "La médaille d'or du meilleur danseur du monde" ("The Gold Medal of the World's Best Dancer") and also the only Grand Prix award winner at the Varna International Ballet Competition since winning the first competition in 1964.

Over the years, Vasiliev has received many of the most prestigious Soviet, Russian and foreign prizes, orders and highest awards including the USSR State Prize, Russian State Prize, Order "For Merit to the Fatherland" and State Order “For Merits” of France, Lithuanian State Order, Order of Rio Branco (Brazil), UNESCO Pablo Picasso Medal and others.

=== Awards ===
- 1959 : Gold Medal, Festival of Youth, Vienna
- 1964 : Grand Prix of Varna at the Varna International Ballet Competition
- 1993 : Crystal Turandot Award for theatre arts, along with Ekaterina Maximova

== Filmography ==
- Katia et Volodia: : A Portrait in Dance with Ekaterina Maximova and Vladimir Vasiliev, film by Dominique Delouche, 58 min, 1988

== See also ==
- List of Russian ballet dancers
