= Bolshoi Babylon =

2015 film

- Theatrical release poster
- Directed by: Nick Read
- Produced by: Mark Franchetti
- Cinematography: Nick Read
- Edited by: Jay Taylor; David Charap
- Music by: Colin Smith; Simon Elms
- Distributed by: Altitude Film Distribution
- Release date: 14 September 2015 (TIFF)
- Running time: 87 minutes
- Country: United Kingdom
- Languages: English; Russian
- Box office: $91,098 (UK)

Bolshoi Babylon is a 2015 British documentary film directed by Nick Read. It is about the history of Russia's Bolshoi Theatre, including Pavel Dmitrichenko's 2013 acid attack on Sergei Filin. It premiered on 14 September at the Toronto International Film Festival.

== Interviews ==
- Maria Alexandrova
- Maria Allash
- Anastasia Meskova
- Vladimir Urin
- Sergei Filin

== Release ==
Bolshoi Babylon premiered on 14 September 2015 at the Toronto International Film Festival. In the US, it was theatrically released on 27 November 2015, after which it aired on the pay television station HBO on 21 December 2015. It was released 8 January 2016 in the UK, where it grossed $91,098.

== Reception ==
Rotten Tomatoes, a review aggregator, reports that 78% of 18 surveyed critics gave the film a positive review; the average rating is 6.4/10. Metacritic rated it 61/100 based on six reviews. Dennis Harvey of Variety wrote that the film "is inevitably diverting as a well-shot partial peek behind the scenes, but reveals far less than intended." Leslie Felperin of The Hollywood Reporter wrote that the documentary becomes most interesting when it explores the theatre's internal politics. Geoffrey Macnab of The Independent rated it 4/5 stars and wrote that it "induces a sense of awe" about the theatre company. Peter Bradshaw of The Guardian rated it 4/5 stars and wrote, "This enthralling documentary reveals the extraordinary upheavals at the Bolshoi Ballet as the tip of Russia’s rage iceberg". Brian Siebert of The New York Times called it "more attractive than illuminating", as it is "surprisingly short on drama" considering the subject matter. Laura Bleiberg of the Los Angeles Times wrote, "These twin tracts of darkness and light, the sordid and the sublime, quite effectively submerge the viewer into a closed world."
