= Finnish Universal Exhibition =

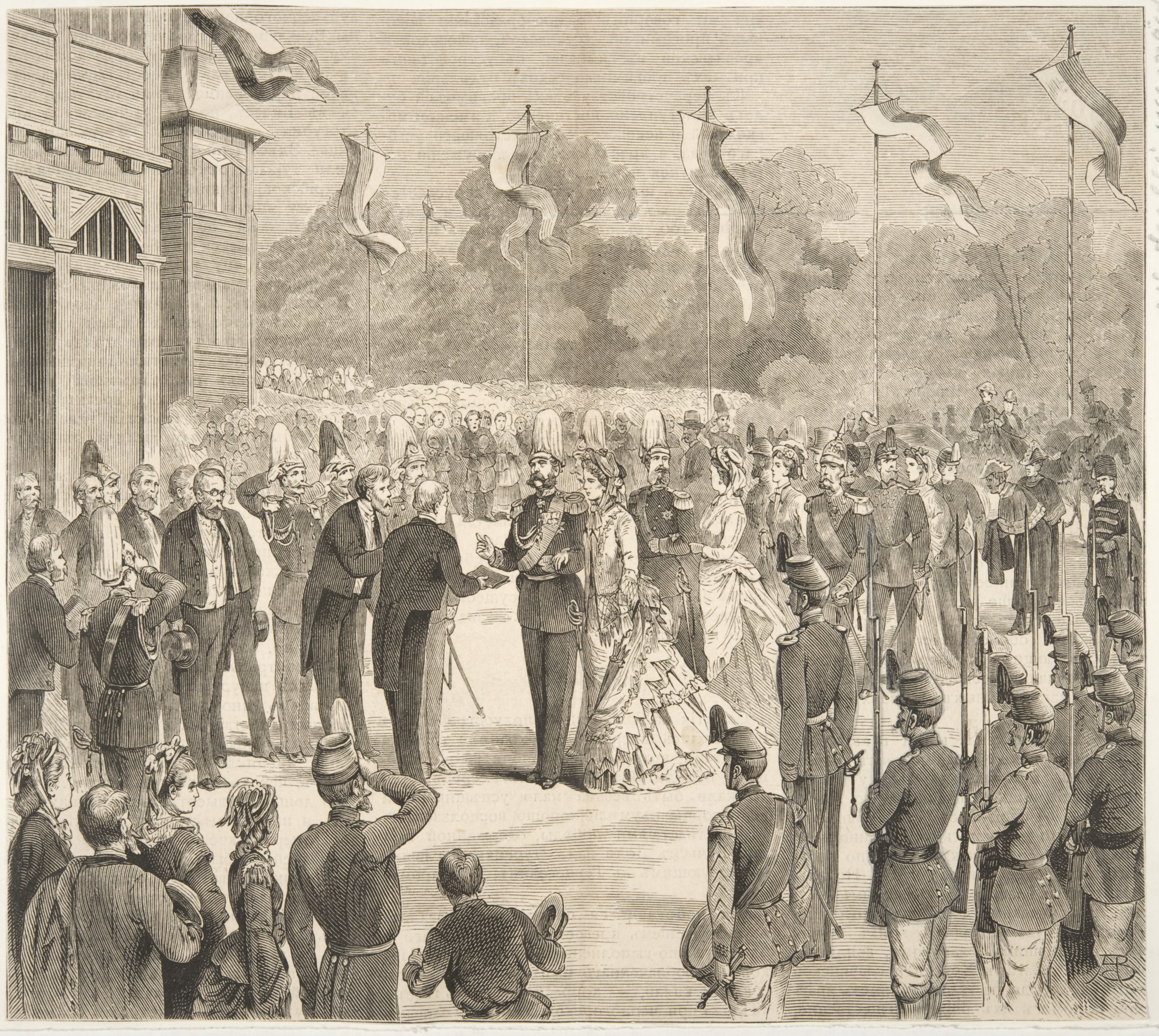
- Alexander II of Russia, Alexander III of Russia, Maria Alexandrova and Maria Feodorovna at the exhibition

Overview
- BIE-class: Unrecognized exposition
- Name: Finnish Universal Exhibition
- Visitors: 90 000
- Organized by: J V Snellman

Location
- Country: Grand Duchy of Finland
- City: Helsinki
- Venue: Kaivopuisto Park
- Coordinates: 60°09′25″N 24°57′25″E

Timeline
- Opening: 1 July 1876
- Closure: mid September 1876

The first Finnish Universal Exhibition was held in Helsinki in 1876. the exhibition had been suggested in 1868, but was impacted by the great famine.

The fair was held at Kaivopuisto Park, led by J.V.Snellman and Theodor Höijeriltä was an architect.

== Exhibits ==
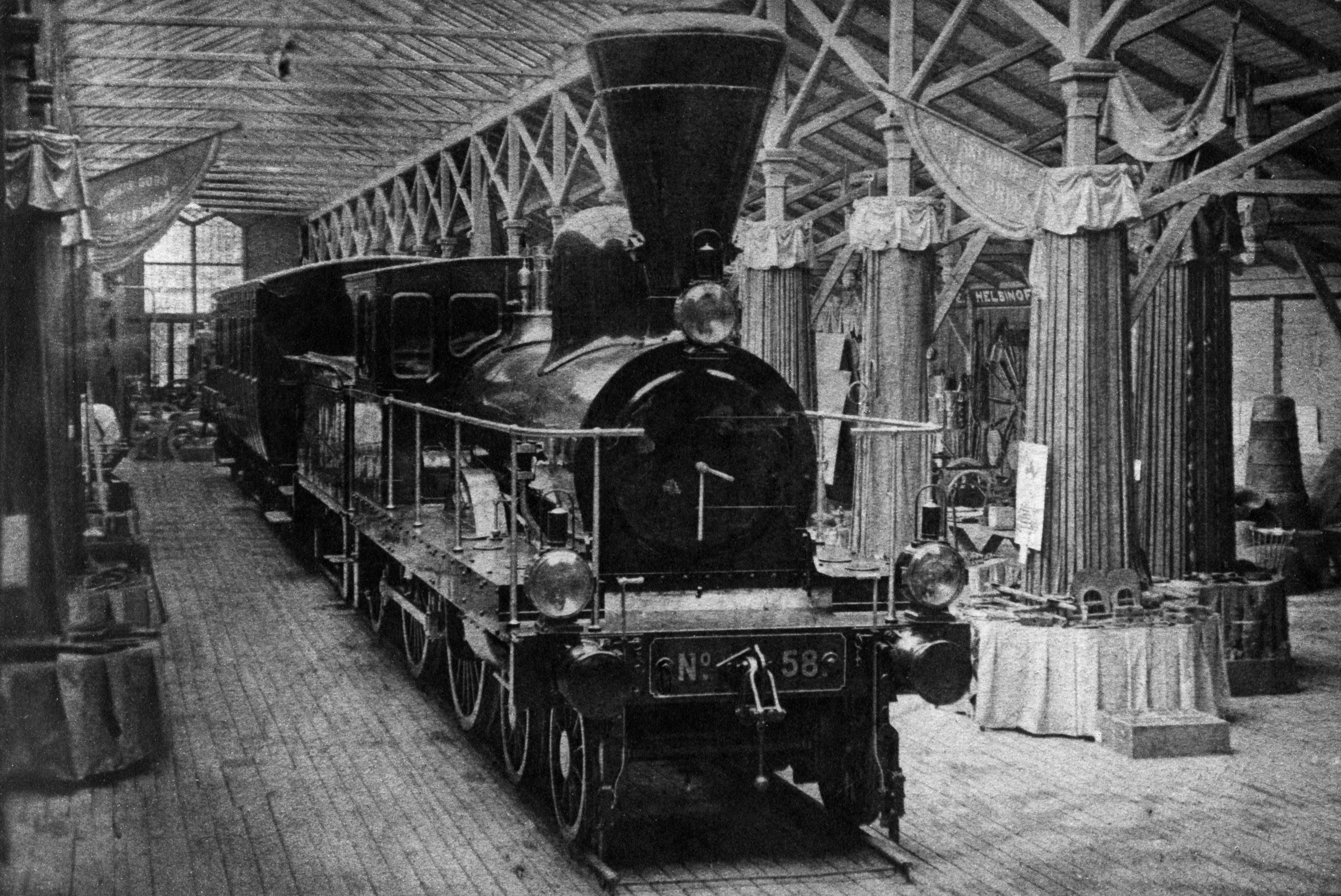
The A5 locomotive at the exhibition

The 1679 exhibitors included one showing a Finnish Steam Locomotive Class A5.

== Visitors ==
Alexander II of Russia, Alexander III of Russia, Maria Alexandrovna and Maria Feodorovna visited 2 weeks after the fair opened. 93000 tickets were redeemed.

== See also ==
- Second International Aeronautic Exhibition
