= Narcopolis (film) =

- DVD cover
- Directed by: Justin Trefgarne
- Written by: Justin Trefgarne
- Produced by: Eldar Tuvey; Justin Trefgarne; Paula Turnbull; Daniel-Konrad Cooper
- Starring: Elliot Cowan; Élodie Yung; Jonathan Pryce; Robert Bathurst; Lenora Crichlow; Harry Lloyd; Nicky Henson; Rufus Wright; Molly Gaisford; Cosima Shaw; Adam Sims; James Callis
- Cinematography: Christopher Moon
- Edited by: Robbie Morrison
- Music by: Matthew Wilcock
- Production company: T Squared Films
- Distributed by: Altitude Film Distribution
- Release date: 19 June 2015 (EIFF)
- Running time: 96 minutes
- Country: United Kingdom
- Language: English
- Budget: <£1 million

Narcopolis is a 2015 British science fiction thriller film written and directed by Justin Trefgarne. The film is set in 2024 after all drugs have been legalised in the United Kingdom. Elliot Cowan stars as a police officer who becomes obsessed with solving a case that involves an experimental new drug developed by the largest pharmaceutical company. Narcopolis premiered at the Edinburgh International Film Festival on 19 June 2015 and was released in the UK on 25 September 2015.

== Plot ==
In 2044, computer hackers destroy the research records of Ambro, the largest and most powerful drug company. Before he can be caught, the lead hacker injects himself with a drug and disappears. Twenty years earlier, Frank Grieves, a former addict and current police officer, discovers a body at Ambro's corporate headquarters. Perplexed as to why his DNA scanner can not identify the body, Grieves becomes obsessed with solving the mystery. The only clue he has is the word "Morlock" hidden on the body. Grieves' superior, Nolan, does not approve of his investigation and instead orders him to work on busting the few remaining street dealers, who operate a shrinking black market since the legalisation of all narcotics.

When Grieves continues his investigation, Ambro puts pressure on the police to rein him in. Eddie Rankin, Grieves' friend and a medical examiner, tells him that an unidentified drug was found in the man's body. Before Grieves or Rankin can examine it further, Ambro has the body destroyed. Against orders, Grieves returns to the site of the crime in search of more clues, where he recovers a young woman, Eva Gray, who has apparently been targeted for assassination by unknown forces. Grieves saves her life, only to find that Gray's assailant has disappeared into thin air. Grieves attempts to find a place to hide Gray, but his estranged wife, Angie, refuses to help. Gray, who is also unidentifiable, escapes his custody when he is distracted.

When pushed, Rankin reveals he knows a scientist, Yuri Sidorov, who may be able to identify the unknown drug. After paying off Rankin's debt to Sidorov, the scientist tells him to return in twenty-four hours. After experiencing further obstruction from Ambro's security and his superiors, Grieves returns early to demand answers from Sidorov. There, he finds Gray, who, after Grieves threatens to harm Sidorov, reveals that she is a time-traveller from 2044. Because she is yet to be born, she has no record in Grieves' DNA database. Grieves dismisses this as the ravings of a junkie and demands to know what Ambro has planned, which he believes may be an experimental drug codenamed "Morlock". Although taken aback that he knows of the word, Gray sticks to her story.

Ambro attacks Grieves as he transports Gray. Suddenly, reinforcements appear out of nowhere, disable Ambro's security forces, and disappear with Gray after injecting her with a drug. After Ambro goons attempt to kidnap his son, Grieves realises that the body he found earlier is the adult version of his 9-year-old son, Ben. "Morlock" is a code word based on The Time Machine, a book that Grieves gave to Ben. Now believing Gray's story, Grieves seeks help from Rankin, who refuses to become further involved. After Grieves leaves, Ambro orders the police to kill Rankin and kidnap Sidorov. Grieves has his family flee the city, and, after confronting Nolan, Grieves is also captured.

Todd Ambro explains that they need Ben, as he will perfect their time-travelling drug, which is currently flawed in a way that prevents people from staying long in their destination unless they are dead. Ambro demonstrates by killing Sidorov and sending his body elsewhere in time. Desperate to protect his company's future, Ambro demands the police torture Ben's location from Grieves. After the others leave, Nolan sets Grieves free, saying that he knows Ambro will kill him next as a security threat. Nolan proposes they work together to escape, but Grieves instead forces one of Ambro's scientists to inject him with the time-travelling drug. Suddenly in 2044, Grieves speaks to his now-adult son and reinforces how important his mission is. Back in 2024, Grieves once again discovers the body at Ambro's headquarters, but this time it is his own body, not his son's.

== Cast ==
- Elliot Cowan as Frank Grieves
- Élodie Yung as Eva Gray
- Jonathan Pryce as Yuri Sidorov
- Robert Bathurst as Kim Nolan
- Harry Lloyd as Ben Grieves
  - Louis Trefgarne as Young Ben Grieves
- Nicky Henson as Chief Ballard
- Rufus Wright as Mason
- Molly Gaisford as Angie Grieves
- Cosima Shaw as Ellen Ambro
- Adam Sims as Eddie Rankin
- James Callis as Todd Ambro
- Kerry Shale as Martin Fox

== Production ==
The film was financed with angel investors similar to a tech start-up. As the film attracted higher profile actors, Trefgarne returned for further financing to better exploit their involvement through reshoots. Further funding came through crowdfunding via Kickstarter. Trefgarne quoted the final budget as under £1 million.

== Release ==
Narcopolis premiered at the Edinburgh International Film Festival on 19 June 2015. Altitude Film Distribution released it in the UK on 25 September 2015. IFC Midnight released the film on 2 October 2015 in the US, where it was accompanied by a tie-in comic book.

== Reception ==
Rotten Tomatoes, a review aggregator, reports that 29% of seven surveyed critics gave the film a positive review; the average rating is 4.5/10. Metacritic rated it 30/100 based on five reviews. Frank Scheck of The Hollywood Reporter wrote that the film's convoluted, self-indulgent plot makes it of interest only to science fiction die-hards. Maitland McDonagh of Film Journal International called it "a strong, if not genre-changing, feature debut". Andrew Pulver of The Guardian rated it 2/5 stars and wrote, "Despite the surface sheen, and some enterprising plot twists, it doesn't entirely convince." Michael Rechtshaffen of the Los Angeles Times wrote that it starts and ends well, but the middle rehashes Blade Runner and The Terminator. Abby Garnett of The Village Voice criticised the film's lack of social commentary in favor of a too-complicated, slow-moving plot. Andrew Marshall of Starburst rated it 5/10 stars and called it "little more than a sci-fi police procedural" that ignores the interesting aspects of its premise.
