= Anatoly Iksanov =

Director of the Bolshoi Theater (born 1952)

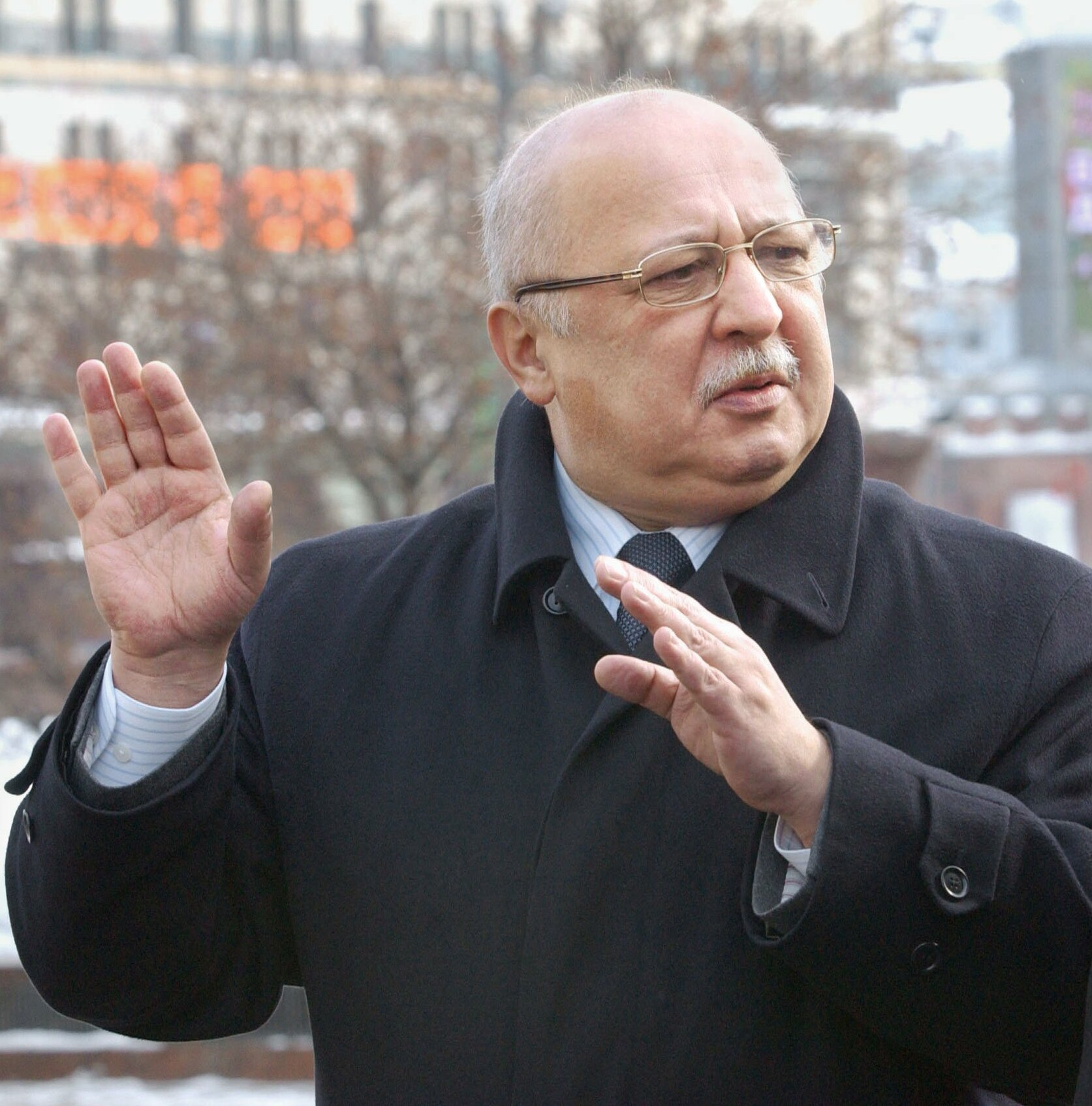
- Anatoly Iksanov near the Bolshoi Theatre (2005)
- Born: Tahir Iksanov; 18 February 1952 (age 74); Leningrad, RSFSR, USSR
- Occupation: Manager
- Years active: 1977–present

Anatoly Gennadyevich Iksanov (Russian: Анатолий Геннадьевич Иксанов; born February 18, 1952) was the General Director of the Bolshoi Theatre of Russia between 2000 and July 2013. His successor was Vladimir Urin.

In 1977, he graduated with a degree in theatre from the Leningrad Institute of Theatre, Music and Cinematography. A year after graduating from the Institute he worked as the chief administrator of the Maly Theatre in Moscow. From 1996 to 1998, he was Director of the Tovstonogov Bolshoi Drama Theater.

Ten years after becoming General Director of the Bolshoi Theatre, he participated in the Theatre's official presentation after its reconstruction. In 2012 he was awarded the Order of Merit of the Italian Republic and the Legion of Honour.
