= Sergei Filin =

Russian ballet dancer (born 1970)

Sergei Filin Серге́й Фи́лин
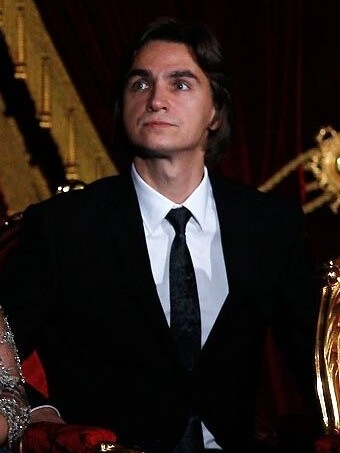
- Sergei Filin, 2011
- Born: Sergei Yurevitch Filin; 27 October 1970 (age 55); Moscow, Russian SFSR, Soviet Union
- Occupation: Director of the Young Artists Ballet Program at the Bolshoi Theatre
- Career
- Former groups: Bolshoi Ballet Company
- Website: Official website

Sergei Yurevitch Filin (Russian: Серге́й Ю́рьевич Фи́лин; born 27 October 1970) is a Russian ballet dancer and the former artistic director of the Bolshoi Theater from 2011 through 2016. He is currently the Director of the Young Artists Ballet Program at the Bolshoi Theatre. Previously, he was the artistic director of the ballet at the Stanislavski and Nemirovich-Danchenko Moscow Academic Music Theatre, serving in this capacity from 2008 to 2011.

== Ballet career ==
Filin was born in Moscow. He started dancing at age seven at the V. Loktev's Children's Ensemble of Folk Dances. At this time, he appeared with Oleg Popov in the film The Sun in the Bag. At the age of nine, he was accepted into the Moscow Choreographic Institute. In 1988, he joined the corps de ballet of the Bolshoi Ballet in Moscow.

He was promoted to the rank of Premier with the Bolshoi Ballet Company in 1990. He was also a principal dancer with the State Ballet of Georgia and guest soloist with the Vienna State Opera. His dance partners have included Galina Stepanenko, Nina Ananiashvili, Svetlana Lunkina, Maria Alexandrova, Svetlana Zakharova, and Natalia Osipova.

Among his repertoire, Filin danced as Colas in La Fille Mal Gardée, the Teacher in The Lesson, and as Classical Dancer in The Bright Stream, a role for which he received the prestigious award Golden Mask.

In December 2004, Filin suffered a severe injury while performing on stage at the Bolshoi Theatre. This incident put his career on hold for several months, before returning to the dance scene in the second half of the following year.

On 18 March 2011, he was appointed to serve as the artistic director of the Bolshoi Ballet in Moscow. In this capacity, he has led the Bolshoi Ballet Tours in Paris, London, Japan and North America.

== Acid attack ==
On 17 January 2013, Filin was attacked with acid by an assailant who cornered him outside of his home in Moscow. He suffered third-degree burns to his face and neck. While it was initially reported that he was in danger of losing his eyesight, his physicians stated on 21 January 2013, that he would retain eyesight in one eye.

A confession to the attack was made by a man named Yury Zarutsky on 5 March 2013. He stated that Bolshoi Ballet Company dancer Pavel Dmitrichenko had hired both him and another man called Andrei Lipatov to attack Filin. According to Zarutsky, Lipatov drove him to Filin's home where he threw the acid in Filin's face. Following the confession, a spokesman from the Russian Interior Ministry stated that investigators considered the case closed. By 7 March, all three men confessed to the crime. Dmitrichenko confessed to arranging the attack, but maintained that he had not instructed the two men to use acid.

The attack came after a lengthy period of infighting and rows within the Bolshoi Ballet Company. Various motives have been presented by Russian police officials, primarily focusing on "personal hostile relations linked to their professional activities". Russia's television news and tabloid journalists surmised that Dmitrichenko was angry when Filin chose another dancer rather than Dmitrichenko's girlfriend, ballerina Anzhelina Vorontsova (ru) to portray Princess Odette, also known as the Swan Queen in Tchaikovsky's Swan Lake.

Dmitrichenko stated during a bail hearing that he was frustrated with the inequitable and "unjust" allocation of funds distributed to dancers in the company. When he voiced his frustration, Zarutsky suggested that they "beat up" Filin. In the courtroom, the judge questioned Dmitrichenko whether or not he would like to apologize to Filin. Dmitrichenko defiantly responded with "For what?" At that point, the judge denied bail, which resulted in incarceration for six weeks, while investigators and attorneys prepared for the trial. The three men who confessed to the crime faced a maximum sentence of 12 years. Dmitrichenko was sentenced to six years in prison, but he was released early for good behavior in May 2016 after serving just three years in prison. In October 2016, Dmitrichenko was granted a building pass to the Bolshoi Theater, and returned for morning exercises.

== Roles ==
Principal roles

- Love for Love – as Benedict
- The Lesson – as Teacher
- Romeo & Juliette – as Paris/Romeo
- Cipollino – as Count Cherry
- Swan Lake – as Prince Siegfried
- Giselle – as Count Albrecht
- The Nutcracker – as Nutcracker Prince
- Sleeping Beauty – as Prince Désiré/Bluebird
- La Bayadere – as Solor
- La Sylphide – as James
- Corsaire – as Konrad/Merchant Pas de Deux
- The Last Tango – as Tom
- Raymonda – as Jean de Brienne
- Don Quixote – as Basil
- La Fille Du Pharaon – as Lord Wilson/Taor
- La Fille Mal Gardée – as Colas
- The Bright Stream – as Classical Dancer
- Leah – as Hanan
- Cinderella – as Prince
- Vain Precaution – as Colin
- Love Through the Eyes of a Detective – as Leading Role

Soloist roles

- Symphony in C
- Dreams about Japan
- Mozartiana
- Tchaikovsky Pas de Deux
- Charms of Mannierism
- Capriccio
- Green
- Opus X
- Sagalobeni

== Honors and awards ==
- 1994: Prix Benois de la Danse International Dance Association Prize for his role of Prince Désiré in Sleeping Beauty
- 1995: Dancer of the Year – Danza-Danza Magazine
- 1996: Merited Artist of the Russian Federation
- 2001: People's Artist of the Russian Federation
- 2002: Soul of Dance ("Star of Dance") Ballet Magazine
- 2004: Golden Mask International Theatre Prize for his role as The Classical Dancer in The Bright Stream
- 2006: International Ballet Award Stars of the XXI Century
