= Exposition Internationale des Arts et Techniques dans la Vie Moderne =

1937 world's fair held in Paris, France

1937 Paris
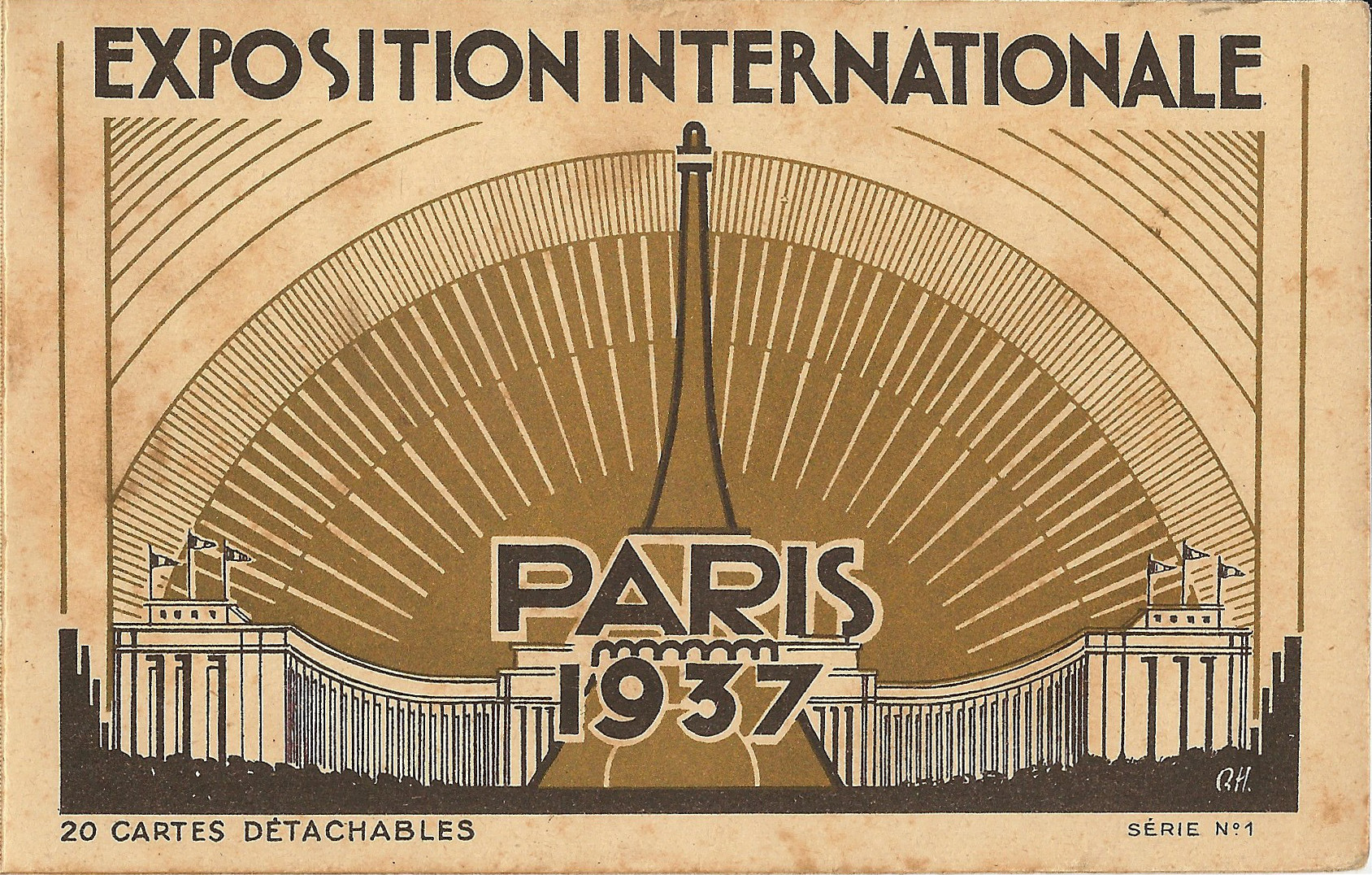

Overview
- BIE-class: World exposition
- Name: Exposition Internationale des Arts et des Techniques appliqués à la vie moderne
- Building(s): Palais de Chaillot; Palais de Tokyo
- Area: 101 hectares (250 acres)
- Visitors: 31,040,955

Participant(s)
- Countries: 45

Location
- Country: France
- City: Paris
- Venue: Trocadéro, Champ-de-Mars, Embankment of the Seine
- Coordinates: 48°51′44″N 02°17′17.7″E

Timeline
- Opening: 25 May 1937
- Closure: 25 November 1937

World expositions
- Previous: Brussels International Exposition (1935) in Brussels
- Next: 1939 New York World's Fair in New York City

Specialised Expositions
- Previous: ILIS 1936 in Stockholm
- Next: Second International Aeronautic Exhibition in Helsinki

Internet
- Website: www.bie-paris.org/site/en/1937-paris

The Exposition Internationale des Arts et Techniques dans la Vie Moderne (International Exposition Dedicated to Art and Technology in Modern Life) was held from 25 May to 25 November 1937 in Paris, France. Both the Palais de Chaillot, housing the Musée de l'Homme, and the Palais de Tokyo, which houses the Musée d'Art Moderne de la Ville de Paris, were created for this exhibition that was officially sanctioned by the Bureau International des Expositions. A third building, Palais d'Iéna, housing the permanent Museum of Public Works, which was originally to be among the new museums created on the hill of Chaillot on the occasion of the Exhibition, was not built until January 1937 and inaugurated in March 1939.

== Exhibitions ==
At first the centerpiece of the exposition was to be a 2,300-foot (700 m) tower ("Phare du Monde") which was to have a spiraling road to a parking garage located at the top and a hotel and restaurant located above that. The idea was abandoned as it was far too expensive.

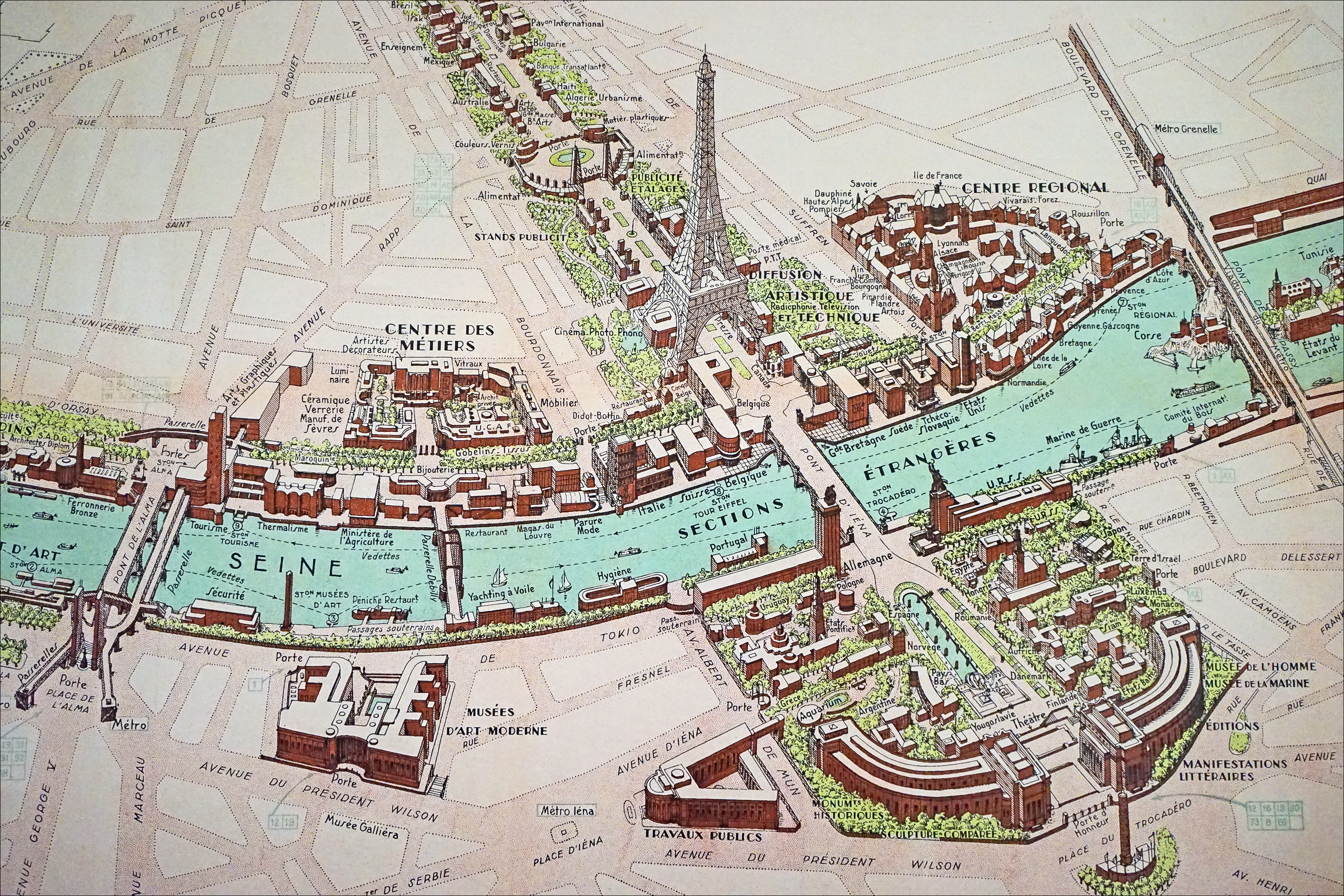
Map of the exhibition

== Pavilions ==
=== Finnish Pavilion ===
The Finnish pavilion was designed by Alvar Aalto, following an open architectural competition held in 1936, where he had won both first and second prize, the winning entry "Le bois est en marche" forming the basis for the pavilion as built. Finland had been given a difficult, sloping wooded site near the Trocadéro, something which Aalto was able to exploit in creating a ground plan featuring an irregular chain of volumes joined in a sort of collage - with small, open, cubic pavilions together with two larger exhibition halls. The entire complex curved around a shady garden with Japanese touches. The pavilion was also an advertisement for Finland's prime export, wood, as the building was built entirely of timber. French architecture historian Fabienne Chevallier has argued that at the time French critics were baffled by Aalto's building because though it was built of wood – and thus endorsing an image of what they perceived Finland to be – they were unprepared for Aalto's avant-gardism.

=== Canadian Pavilion ===
Canada had initially not planned to take part in the exposition because of reasons of cost. In February 1936, at a party in Ottawa, Raymond Brugère, the French minister-plenipotentiary pressed the prime minister William Lyon Mackenzie King and his Quebec lieutenant Ernest Lapointe, about Canada taking part in the Exposition Internationale des Arts et Techniques dans la Vie Moderne, saying he very much wanted Canada to have a pavilion. King hesitated, saying he did not know if his government could afford the cost of building a pavilion, but Brugère forced his hand by sending a telegram to Paris, saying that Canada would take part, leading to an announcement being made in Paris.

Fitting in the architectural master-plan of the master architect Jacques Gréber at the foot of the Eiffel Tower, and inspired by the shape of a grain elevator, the Canadian pavilion included Joseph-Émile Brunet's 28-foot sculpture of a buffalo (1937), and Charles Comfort's The Romance of Nickel. Paintings by Brunet, sculpted panels on the outside of the structure, and several thematic stands inside the Canadian pavilion depicted aspects of Canadian culture.

=== Norwegian Pavilion ===
The Norwegian pavilion was designed by Knut Knutsen, Arne Korsmo and Ole Lind Schistad. It included Hannah Rygen's tapestry Ethiopia.

=== Spanish Pavilion ===
The Spanish pavilion was arranged by the President of Spain Spanish Republican government and built by the Spanish architect Josep Lluis Sert. It attracted extra attention because the exposition took place during the Spanish Civil War. The pavilion included Pablo Picasso's Guernica, the now-famous depiction of the horrors of war, as well as Alexander Calder's sculpture Mercury Fountain and Joan Miró's painting Catalan peasant in revolt.

=== German Pavilion ===
Two of the other notable pavilions were those of Nazi Germany and the Soviet Union. The organization of the world exhibition had placed the German and the Soviet pavilions directly across from each other. Hitler had desired to withdraw from participation, but his architect Albert Speer convinced him to participate, showing Hitler his plans for the German pavilion. Speer later revealed in his autobiographies that having had a clandestine look at the plans for the Soviet pavilion, he designed the German pavilion to represent a bulwark against Communism.

The preparation and construction of the exhibits were plagued by delay. On the opening day of the exhibition, only the German and the Soviet pavilions had been completed. This, as well as the fact that the two pavilions faced each other, turned the exhibition into a competition between the two great ideological rivals.

Speer's pavilion was culminated by a tall tower crowned with the symbols of the Nazi state: an eagle and the swastika. The pavilion was conceived as a monument to "German pride and achievement". It was to broadcast to the world that a new and powerful Germany had a restored sense of national pride. At night, the pavilion was illuminated by floodlights. Josef Thorak's sculpture Comradeship stood outside the pavilion, depicting two enormous nude males, clasping hands and standing defiantly side by side, in a pose of mutual defense and "racial camaraderie". Television was shown as a novelty in German pavilion.

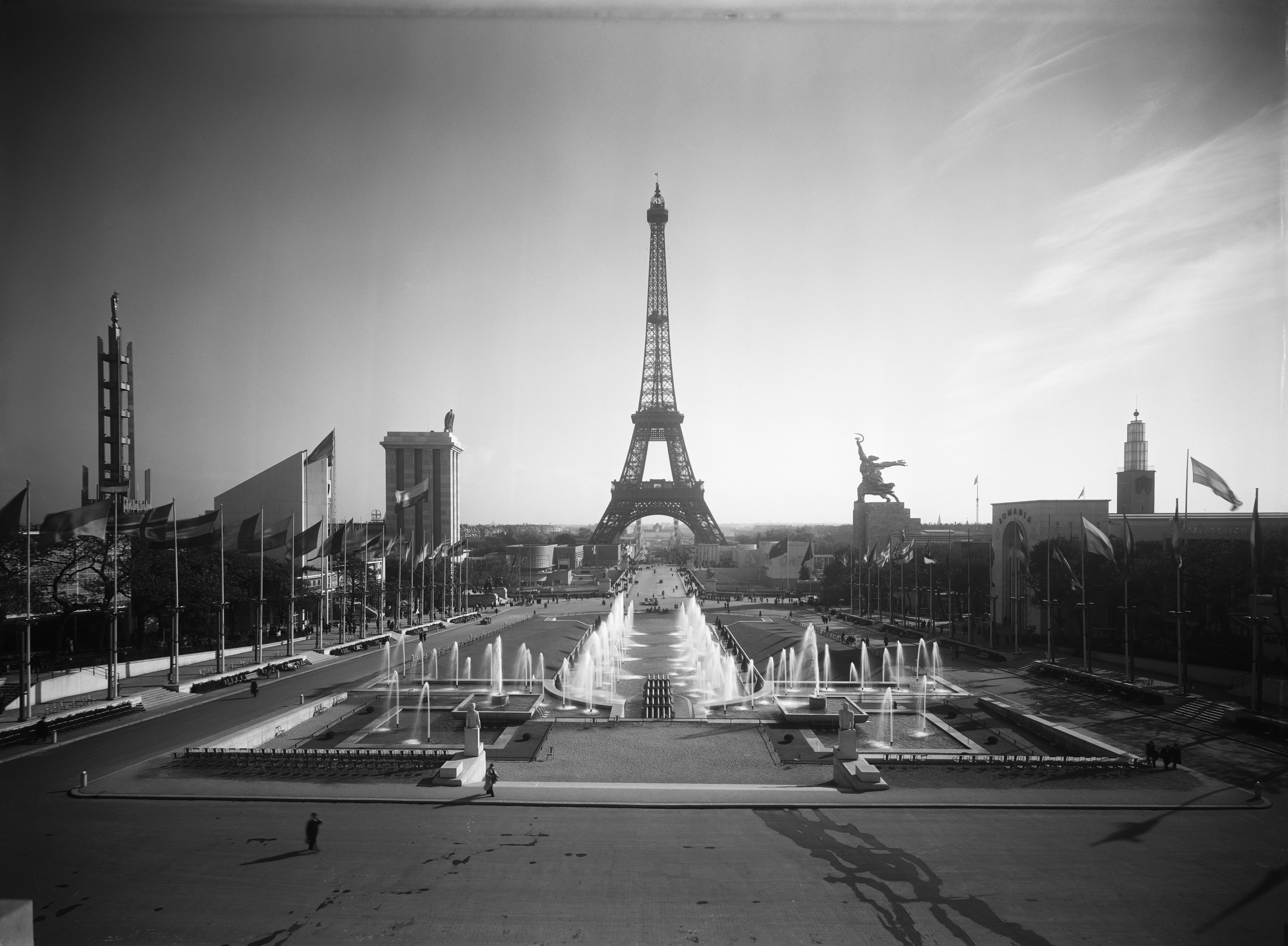
The Nazi German pavilion (left) and the Soviet pavilion (right) in the Gardens of the Trocadero with the Eiffel Tower in the background

=== Soviet Pavilion ===
The architect of the Soviet pavilion was Boris Iofan. Vera Mukhina designed the large figurative sculpture on the pavilion. The grand building was topped by Worker and Kolkhoz Woman, a large momentum-exerting statue, of a male worker and a female peasant, their hands together, thrusting a hammer and a sickle. The statue was meant to symbolize the union of workers and peasants.

=== Italian Pavilion ===
Marcello Piacentini was given the job of designing the pavilion exterior. He used a modern reinforced concrete frame combined with traditional elements such as colonnades, terraces, courts and galleries, the tower form, Classical rhythms and the use of Mediterranean marble and stucco. The pavilion was nestled under the Eiffel tower looking out over the Seine to the main part of the Exposition site.

Giuseppe Pagano was responsible for the overall co-ordination of the exhibits and was the first impact on entering the building, its large courtyard garden and its hall of honour. The main entry was through the "Court of Honour." Arturo Martini's Victory of the Air presided over the space, its dark bronze form standing out against a backdrop of blue-grey Venetian mosaic tiles. From there visitors could visit the Colonial Exhibits by Mario Sironi and the Gallery of Tourism. The courtyard garden used green grass and green-glazed tiles set against red flowers and burgundy porphyry.

The Hall of Honour 'repurposed' an existing artwork: Mario Sironi's Corporative Italy (Fascist Work) mosaic from the 1936 Triennale that had now been completed with numerous figures engaged in different types of work and the figure of the imperial Roman eagle. The 8m x 12 m work towered over the two-storey height space that occupied the top of the pavilion's tower, making it the centre piece of the pavilion's propaganda program. The enthroned figure of Italy represented corporatism, the economic policy of Italian fascism. Italy's newest industrial material such as linoleum and Termolux (shatterproof plate glass) were used next to a chandelier from Murano and amber marble.

=== British Pavilion ===
Britain had not been expecting such a competitive exposition, and its planned budget was only a small fraction of Germany's. Frank Pick, the chairman of the Council for Art and Industry, appointed Oliver Hill as architect but told him to avoid modernism and to focus on traditional crafts. The main architectural element of Hill's pavilion was a large white box, decorated externally with a painted frieze by John Skeaping and internally with giant photographic figures which included Neville Chamberlain fishing. Its contents were crafts objects arranged according to English words which had become loanwords in French, such as "sport" and "weekend", and included some items by renowned potter William Worrall. There was considerable British criticism that the result was unrepresentative of Britain and compared poorly to the other pavilions' projections of national strength.

=== Pavillon des Temps Nouveaux ===
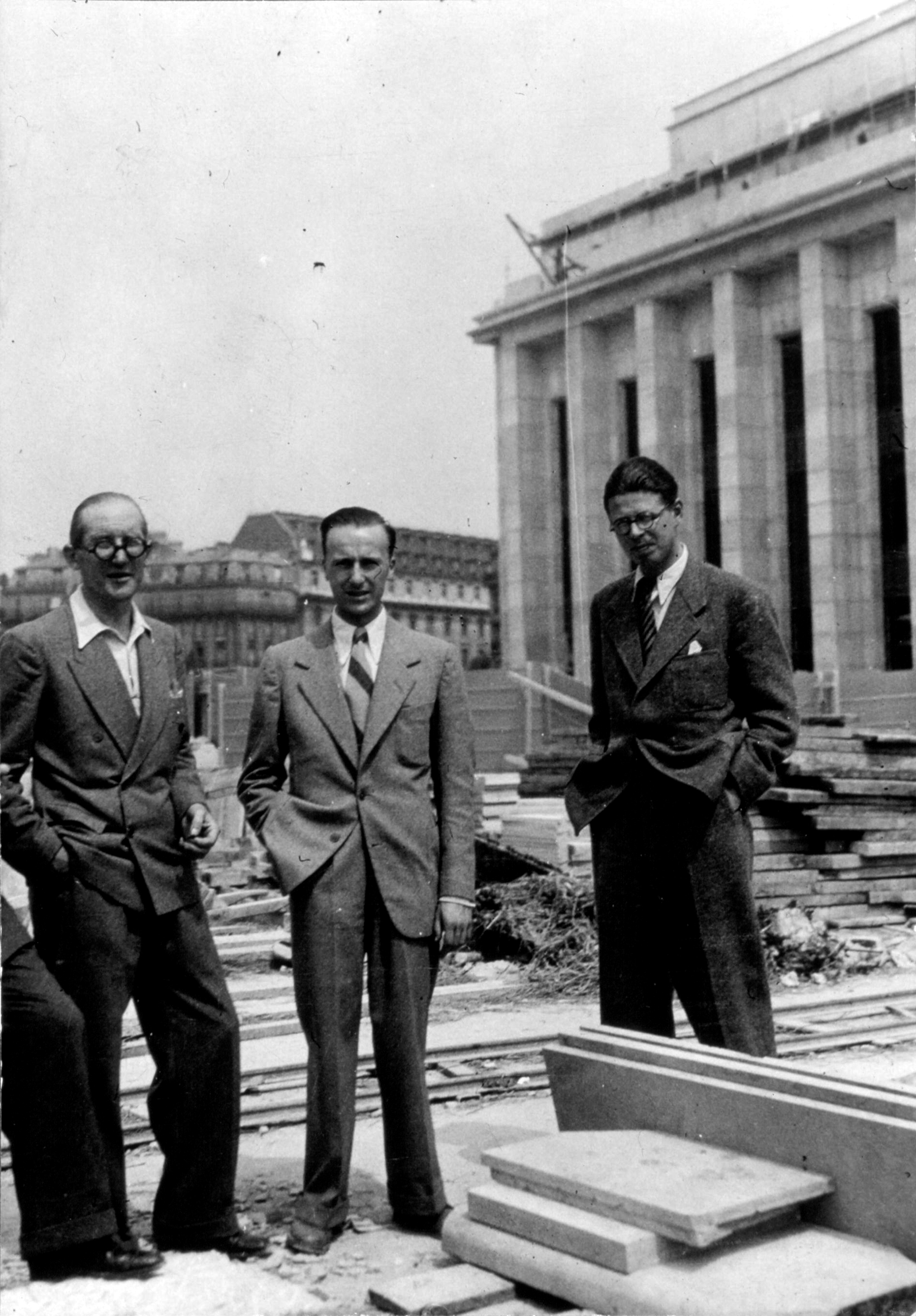
Le Corbusier in front of the Palais de Chaillot in Paris during the World Expo in 1937

The Pavillon des Temps Nouveaux (Pavilion of New Times) was a tent pavilion designed by Le Corbusier and Pierre Jeanneret. In 1932, Le Corbusier heard the announcement of the proposed Expo and immediately issued an ambitious counter proposal. When funding for his project failed to materialise, he offered several scaled down versions, none of which attracted the necessary funding. Finally Le Corbusier was offered a budget of 500,000 FF with which he built a canvas pavilion filled with didacitic material promoting his utopian vision of future urbanism.

== Awards ==
- At the presentation, both Speer and Iofan, who also designed the Palace of Soviets that was planned to be constructed in Moscow, were awarded gold medals for their respective designs. Also, for his model of the Nuremberg party rally grounds, the jury granted Speer, to his and Hitler's surprise, a Grand Prix.
- Artist Johanne deRibert Kajanus, mother of composer Georg Kajanus and film-maker Eva Norvind, granddaughter of composer and conductor Robert Kajanus, and grandmother of actress Nailea Norvind, won a bronze medal for her life-size sculpture of Mother and Child at the exhibition.
- Polish modern architect Stanisław Brukalski won a bronze medal for his own house, designed together with his wife Barbara Brukalska, built in Warsaw in 1929, likely inspired by Gerrit Rietveld's Schröderhuis which he visited.
- Polish company, First Factory of Locomotives in Poland Ltd., won a gold medal for the first Polish streamlined steam locomotive Pm36-1 (140 km/h) which arrived in Paris for the expo, another Polish company, Lilpop, Rau i Loewenstein, also won a gold medal for the tourist train (couchette, club carriage and bath/spa carriage). A curious Polish cruise train reserved for skiers included, in addition to the sleeping car, a bar-cinema-dancing car, two bathrooms, a complete installation of showers, a hairdressing salon and even an operating room for urgent intervention.
- American architect Alden Dow won the "grand prize for residential architecture" for his John S. Whitman House, built in Midland, Michigan, US.
- Soviet architect Andrey Kryachkov won the Grand Prix for designing his 100-flat building located in Novosibirsk.
- Soviet-Jewish photographer Max Penson won the photography Grand Prix for his photograph "Uzbek Madonna"
- Serbian painter Ivan Tabaković won the Grand Prix for ceramics.
- Lepoglava (Slovenia, Croatia) bobbin lace won a gold medal. (Note: Lepoglava bobbin lace, along with Pag needle lace and Hvar aloe fiber lace, were pooled together for Unesco's listing as Intangible cultural heritage in 2009. See Lacemaking in Croatia.)
- German textile designer, weaver and former Bauhaus student Margaretha Reichardt (1907–1984) won an honorary diploma for her Gobelin tapestry.
- German electric locomotive DRG Class E 18 (150 km/h) won a gold medal.
- The Malashat al-Kiswa, the Cairo workshop that made textiles for the holy sites of Islam, won a Diplôme de Médaille d'Or ("diploma for a gold medal").
- Commercial Artist Eva Harta, daughter of Austrian Portrait Painter Felix Albrecht Harta won a silver medal for applied peasant motifs on wooden box tops.-letter dated March, 9th 1938 from International Jury to Eva Harta. Verified by Larry Heller, son of the artist.
- Eurythmy ensemble from the Goetheanum (Dornach, Switzerland) was recognized with a gold medal for the best modern dance act.

== Festivals of the Exposition ==
- 23 May – The Centenary of the Arc de Triomphe
- 5–13 June – The International Floralies
- 26 June – Motorboat races on the Seine
- 29 June – Dance Festival
- July – Midsummer Night's Dream (In the gardens of Bagatelle)
- 3 July – Horse Racing
- 4–11 July – Rebirth of the City
- 21 July – Colonial Festival
- 27 July – World Championship Boxing Matches
- 30 July – 10 August – The True Mystery of the Passion (before Notre Dame Cathedral)
- 12 September – Grape Harvest Festival
- 18 October — Naissance d'une cité – Birth of a City
- Forty Two International Sporting Championships
- Every Night: Visions of Fairyland on the Seine

== Gallery ==
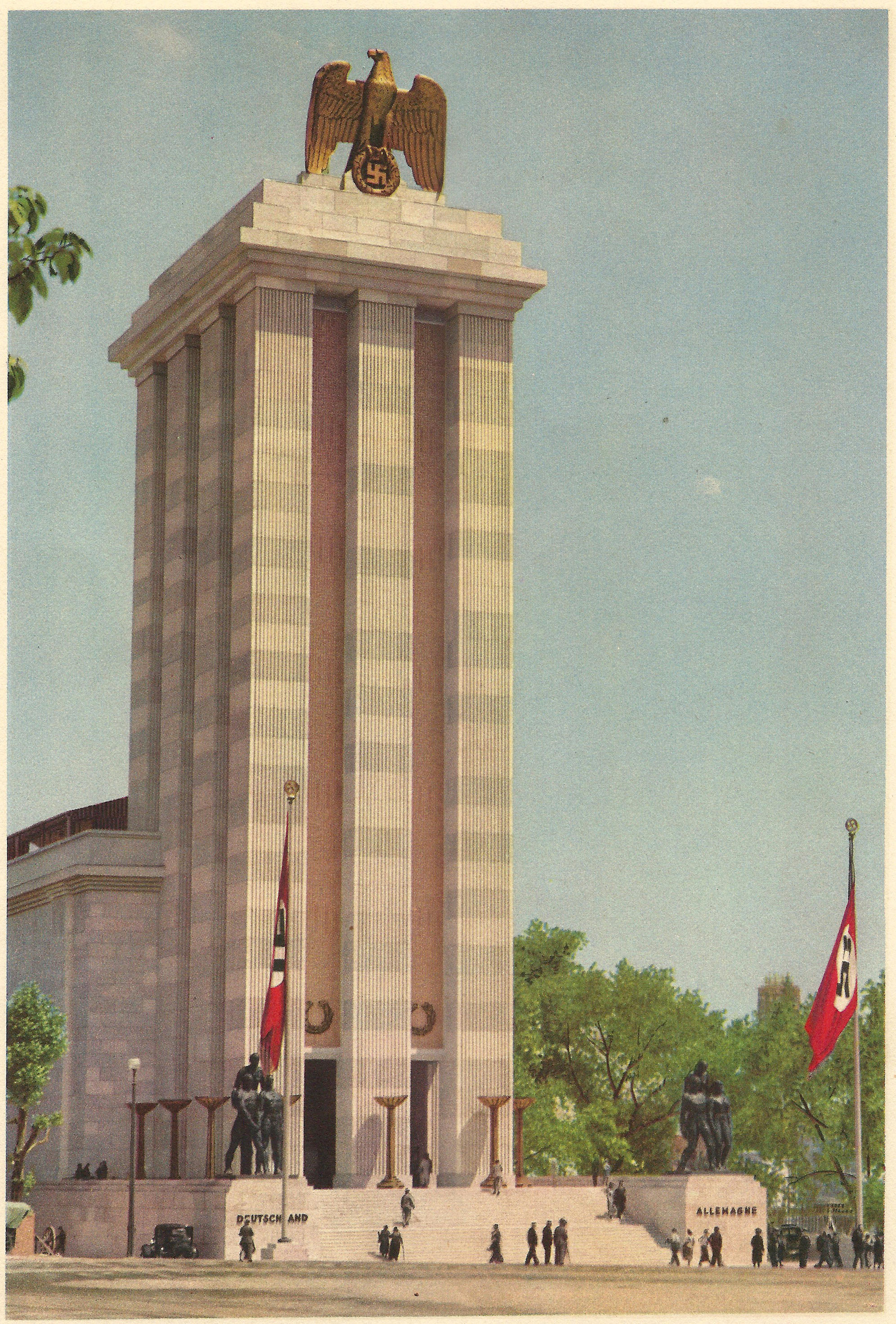
The Nazi German pavilion (Procédé Gorsky frères)

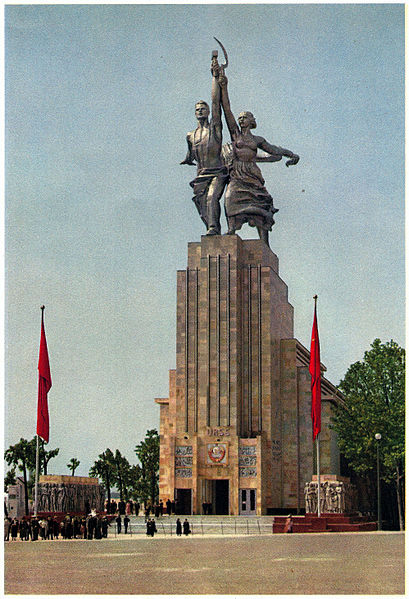
The Soviet pavilion

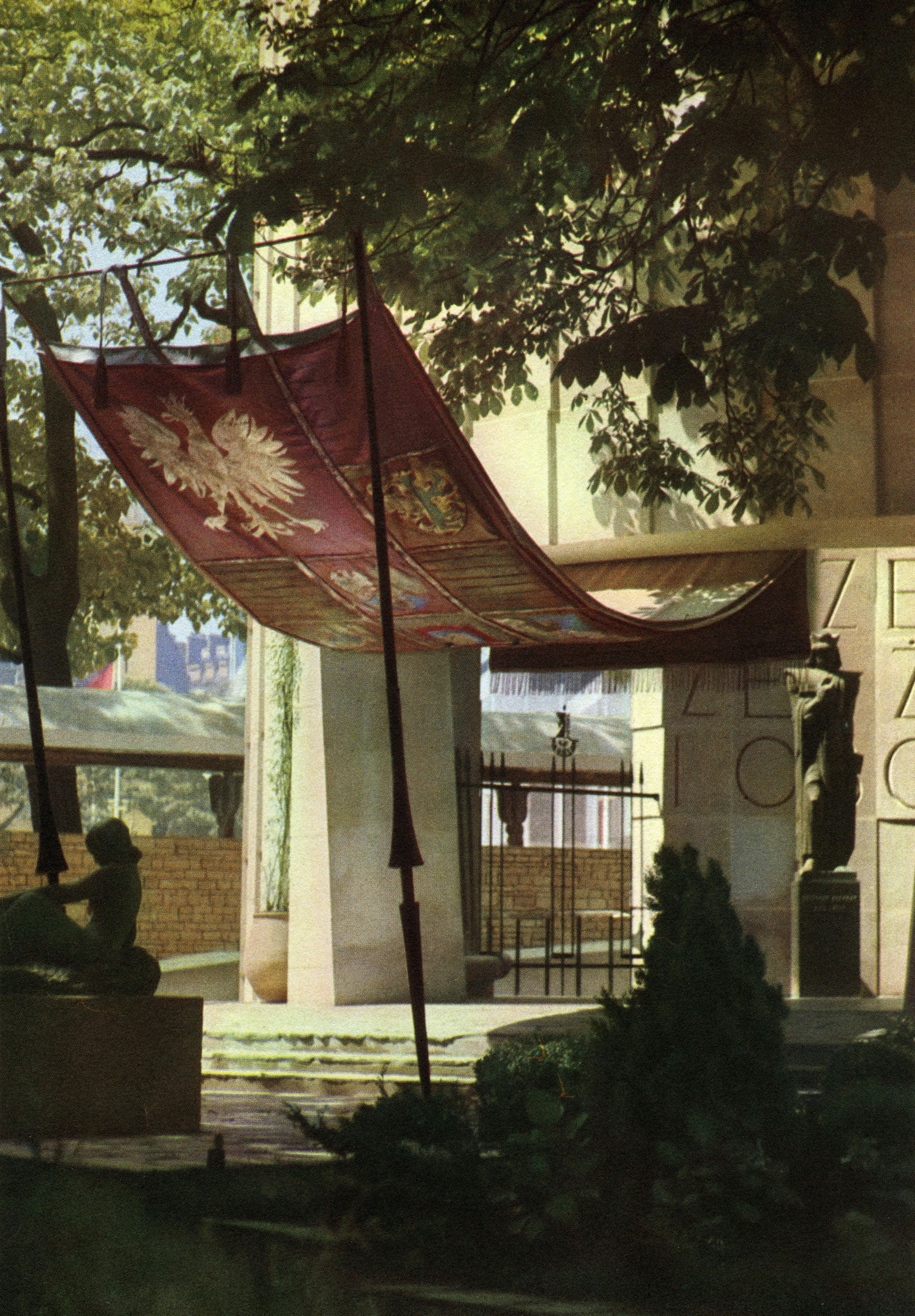
The Polish pavilion

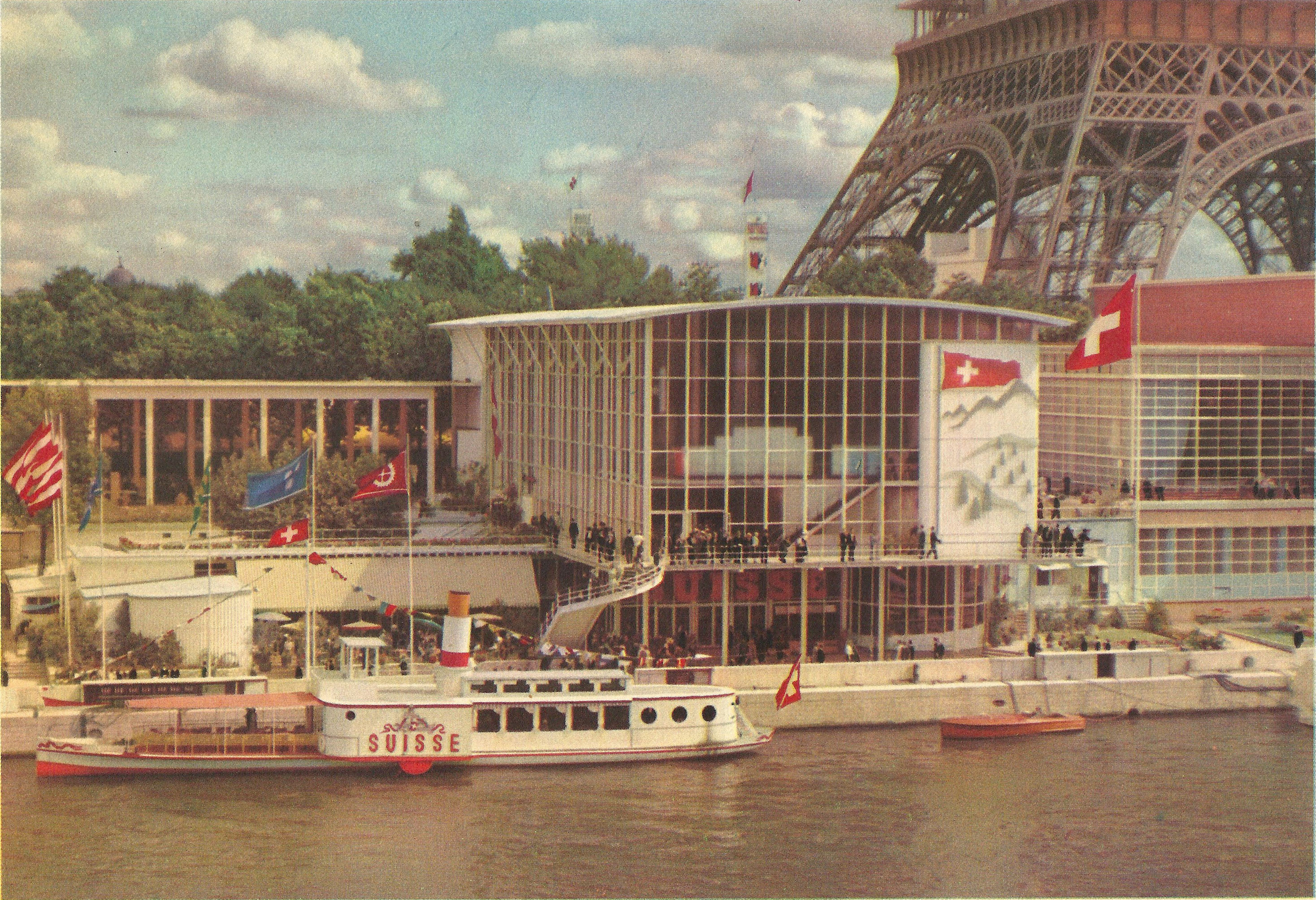
The Swiss pavilion

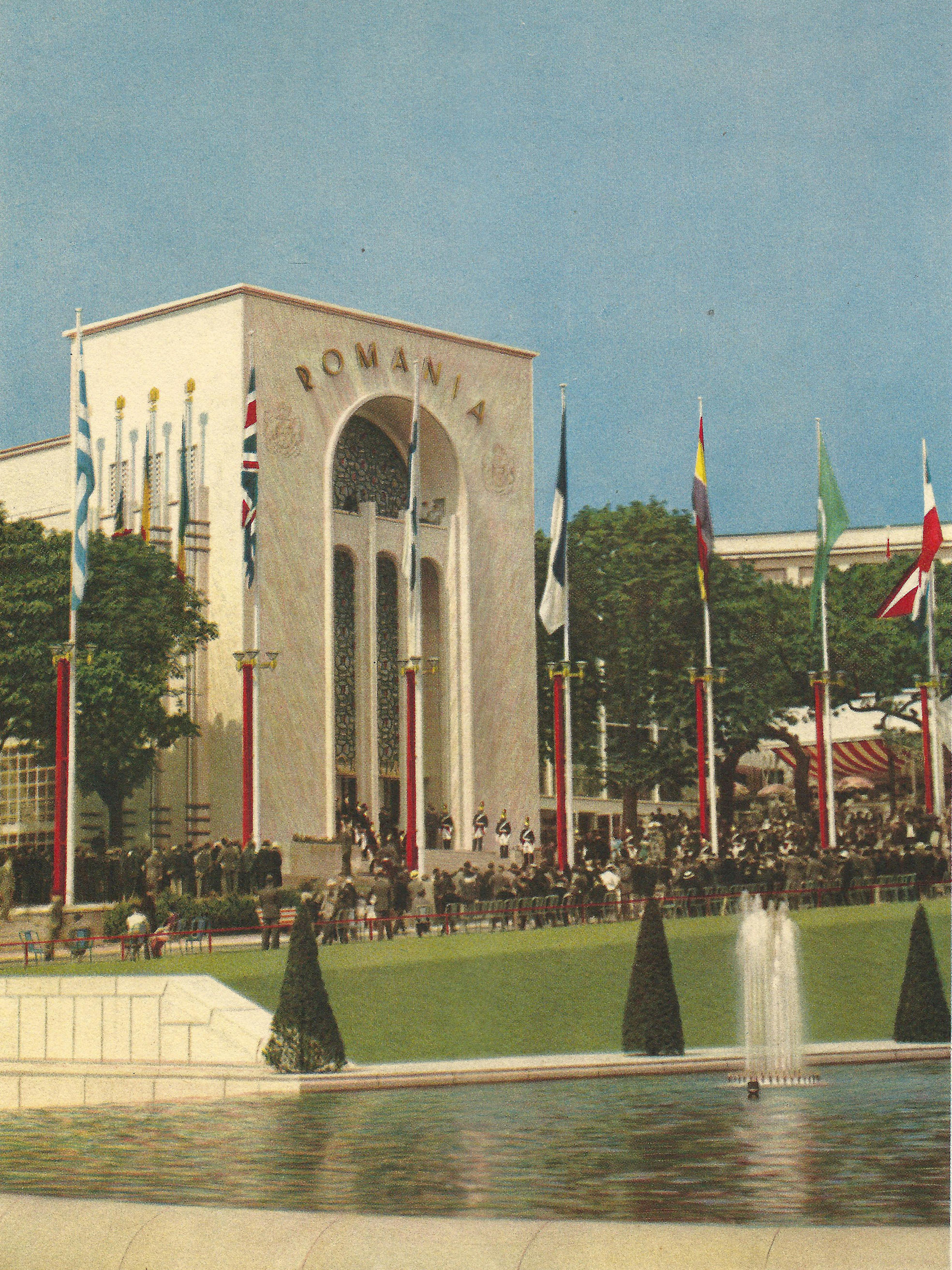
The Romanian pavilion

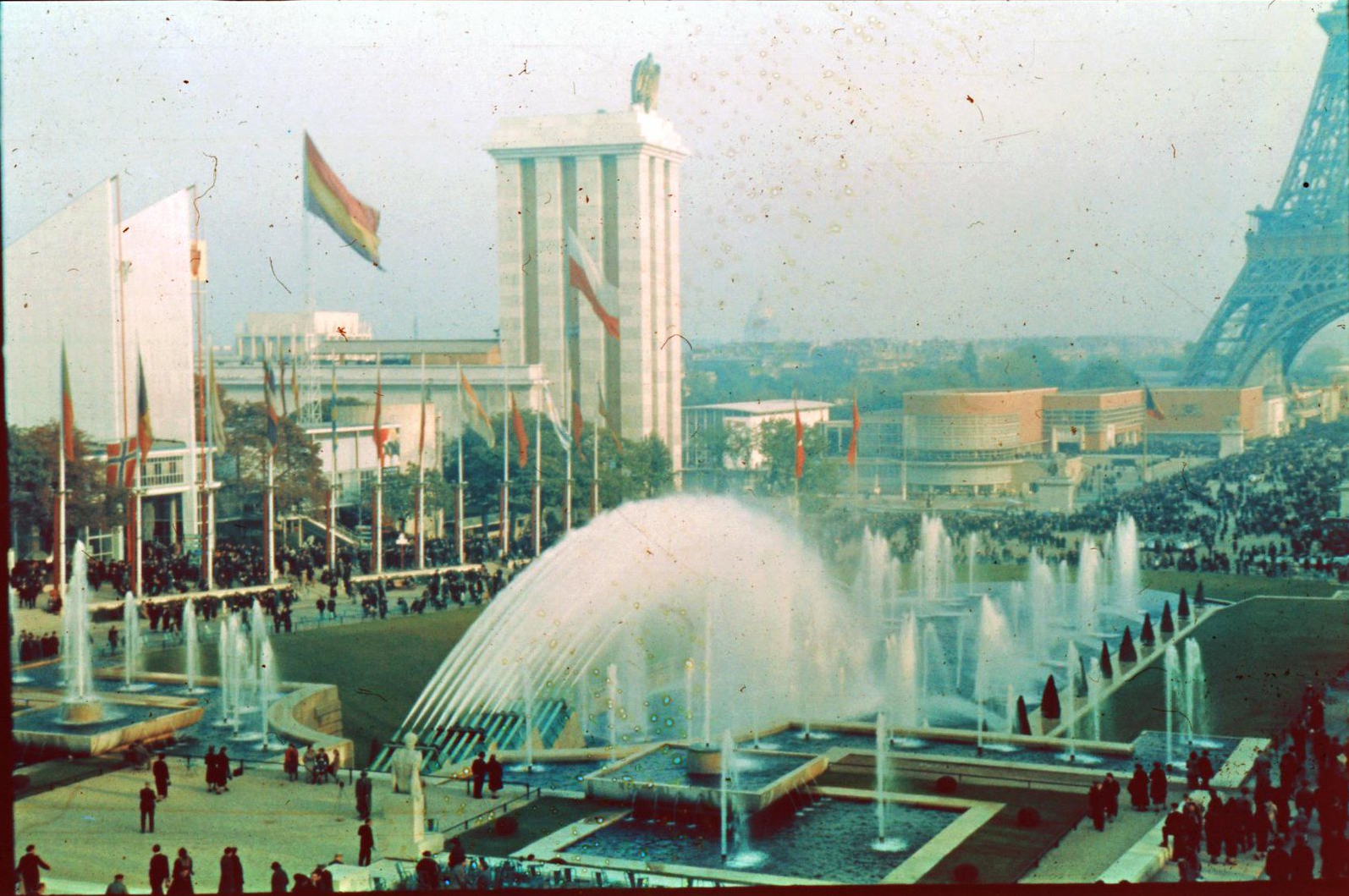
Place de Varsovie in Paris during the expo in 1937 (Agfacolor)

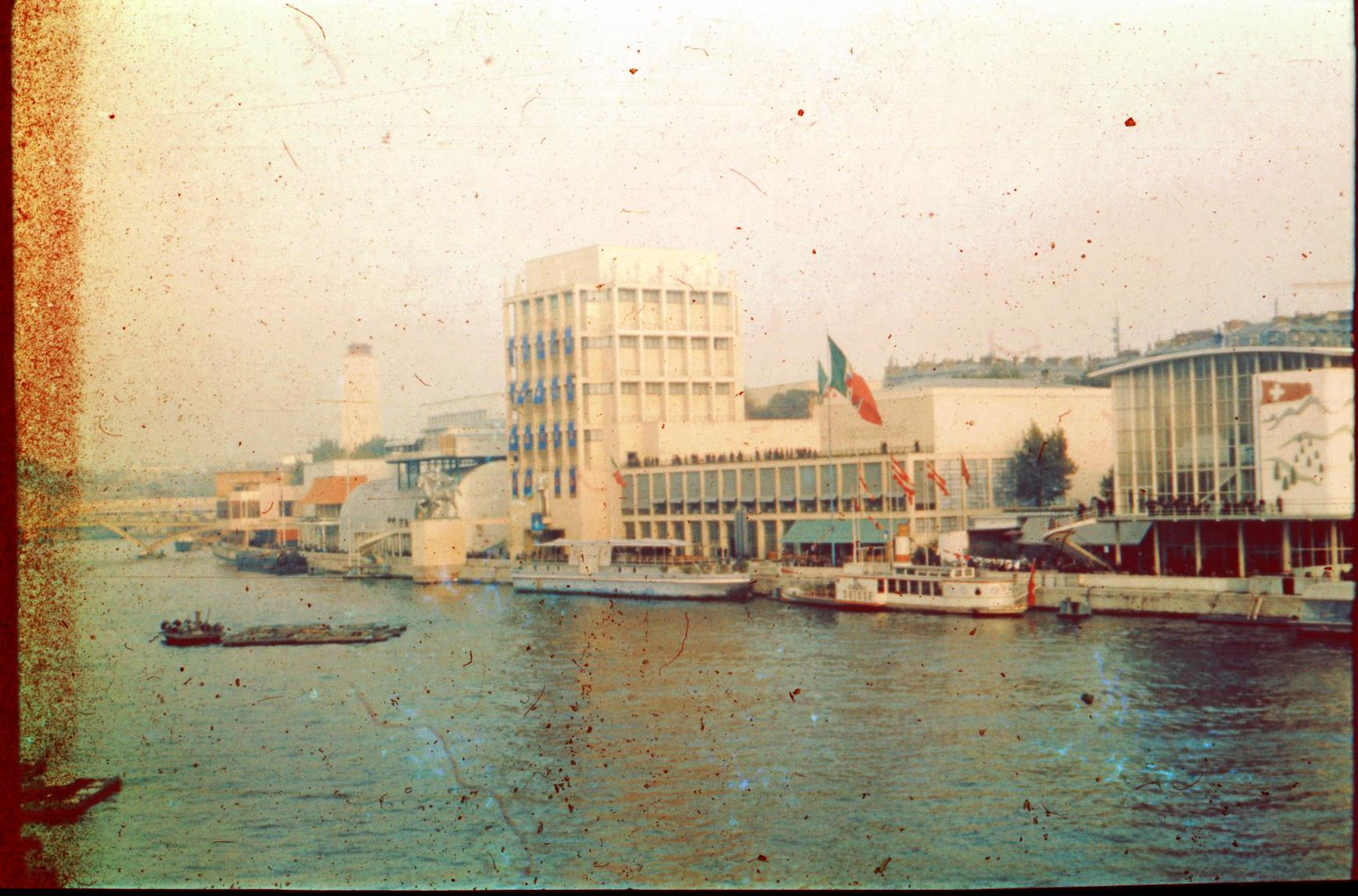
The river Seine, the Italian and Swiss pavilions

The Dutch Pavilion

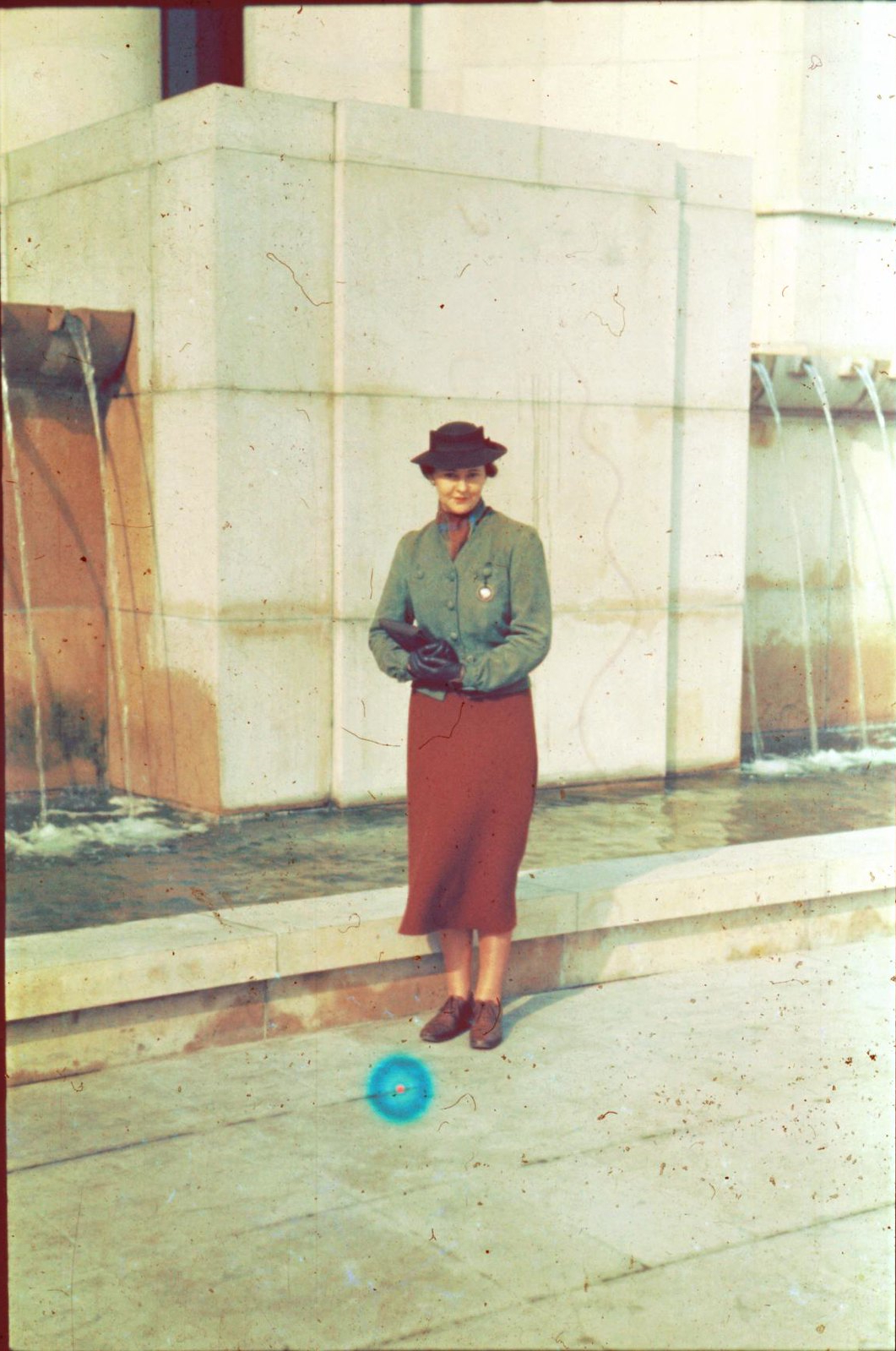
The Palais de Chaillot, fountain at the entrance to the building

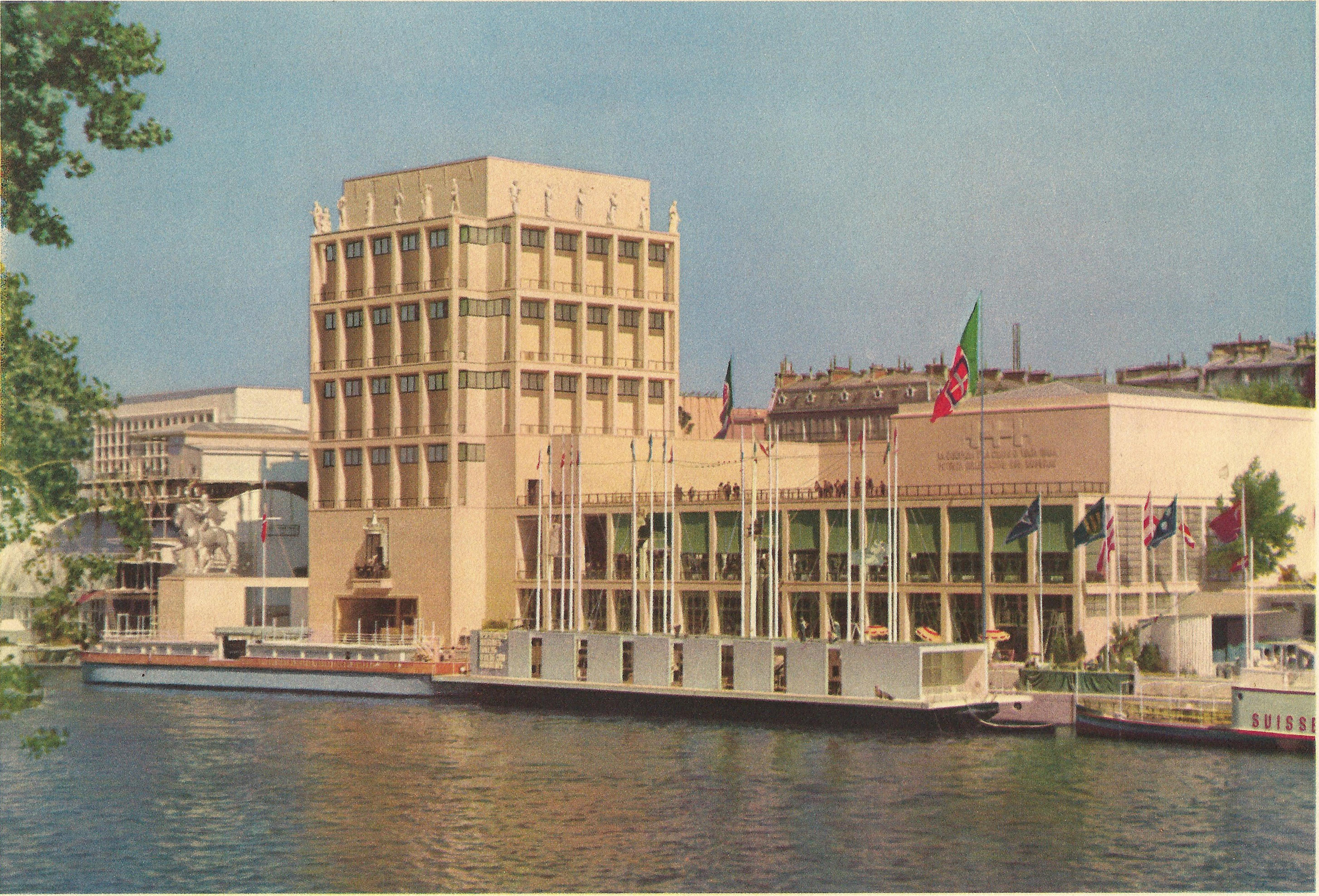
The Italian Pavilion

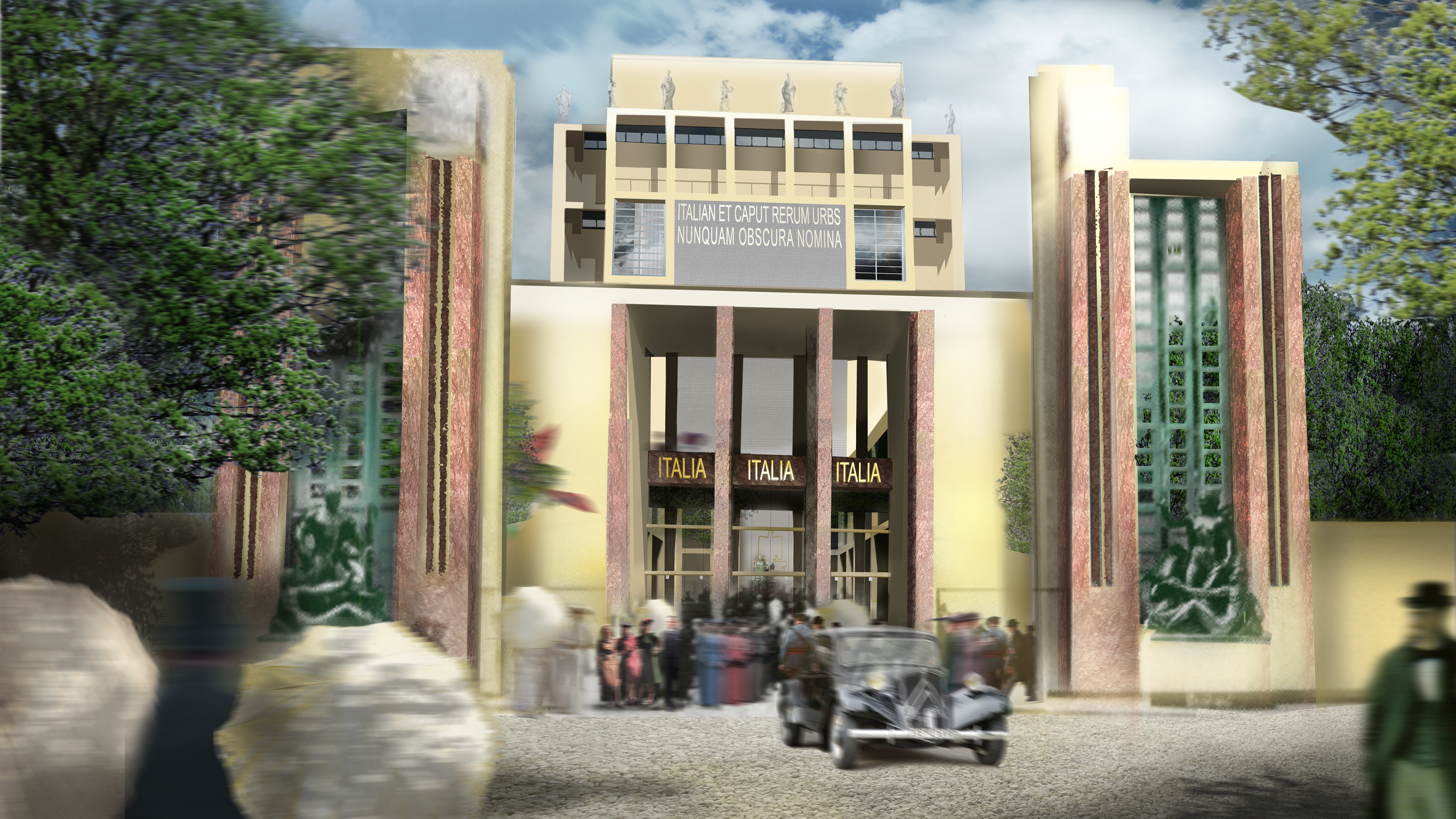
Entrance to the Italian Pavilion
(reconstruction)

== Reproduction of the Soviet Pavilion ==
After the Paris exhibition closed, Worker and Kolkhoz Woman was moved to the entrance of the All-Russia Exhibition Centre in Moscow, where it stood on a high platform. The sculpture was removed for restoration in 2003, intended to be completed by 2005. However, due to financial issues the restoration was delayed. On 28 November 2009 the sculpture was completed and returned to its place in front of the VDNKh. On 4 December 2009 the sculpture was revealed on the recreated pavilion structure.

== Reproduction of the Spanish Pavilion ==
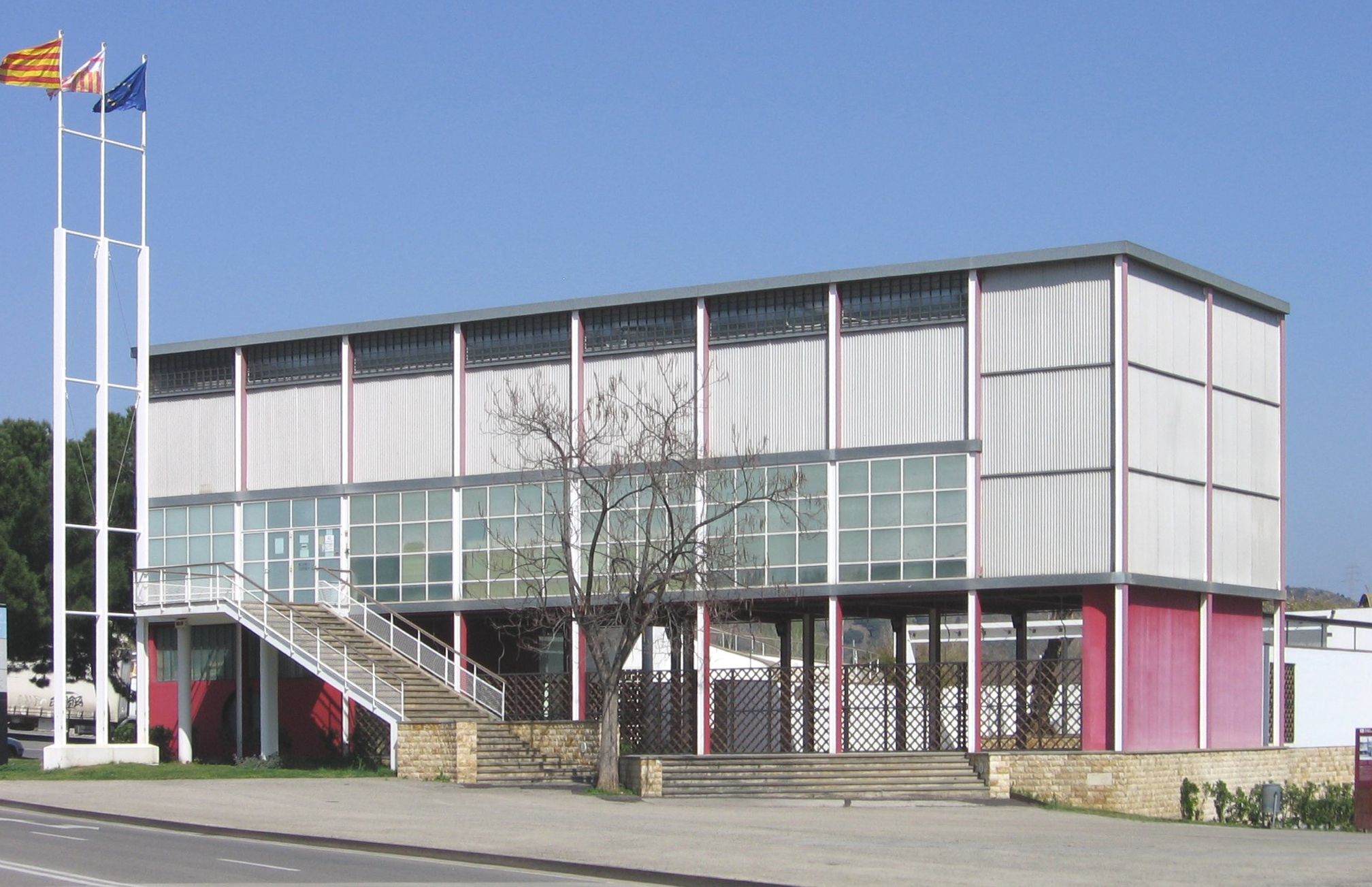
A replica (built in Barcelona in 1992) of the Spanish Republic pavilion.

== In popular culture ==
- Mags L. Halliday's 2002 novel History 101 shows the main characters visiting Picasso's Guernica at the Exhibition and realising that time "has been changed".

== See also ==
- Nazi architecture
- Stalinist architecture
- Streamline Moderne architecture
