= Second International Aeronautic Exhibition =

1938 exhibition in Helsinki, Finland

1938 Helsinki
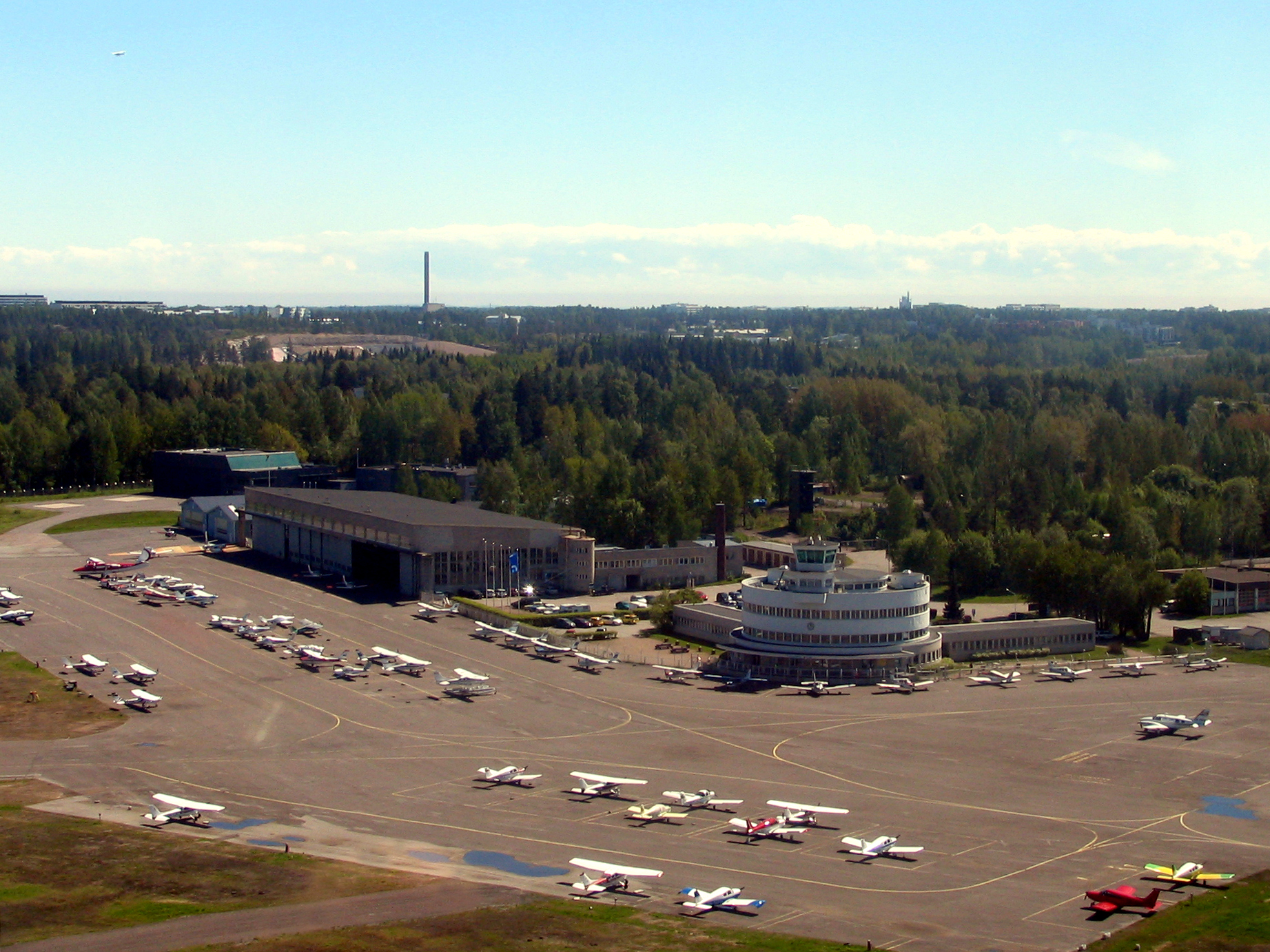
- Malmi airport in 2006, with the round terminal of 1938

Overview
- BIE-class: Specialized exposition
- Name: Second International Aeronautical Exhibition
- Building(s): Malmi Airterminal
- Area: 15.2 hectares (38 acres)
- Visitors: 15,000,000

Participant(s)
- Countries: 25

Location
- Country: Finland
- City: Helsinki
- Venue: Helsinki-Malmi Airport
- Coordinates: 60°15′14″N 25°02′39″E

Timeline
- Opening: 14 May 1938
- Closure: 22 May 1938

Specialized expositions
- Previous: ILIS 1936 in Stockholm
- Next: Exposition internationale de l'eau (1939) in Liège

Universal Expositions
- Previous: Exposition Internationale des Arts et Techniques dans la Vie Moderne in Paris
- Next: 1939 New York World's Fair in New York City

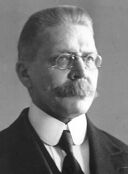
Aimo Cajander

The Second International Aeronautic Exhibition, (full name Second International Aeronautical Exhibition in the league Air Defence of Finland SILI) was held in Helsinki in 1938. It ran from 14 May to 22 May 1938.

It was a special exhibition recognised by the Bureau International des Expositions (BIE) which attracted 25 participating countries including Czechoslovakia, Finland, Germany, Great Britain, Hungary, Latvia, and Sweden; and 15 million visitors and took place in Helsinki's exhibition hall. The commissioners were Alexander Frey, Erik von Frenckell and Mauri Honkajuuri director of Kansallis-Osake-Pankki. Visitors included the racing driver S. P. J. Keinänen and the prime minister Aimo Cajander

Aircraft on display included Morane-Saulnier Type L, Fokker C.X, VL Tuisku and VL Viima.

== See also ==
- Finnish Universal Exhibition
