= Altitude Film Distribution =

British film distribution company

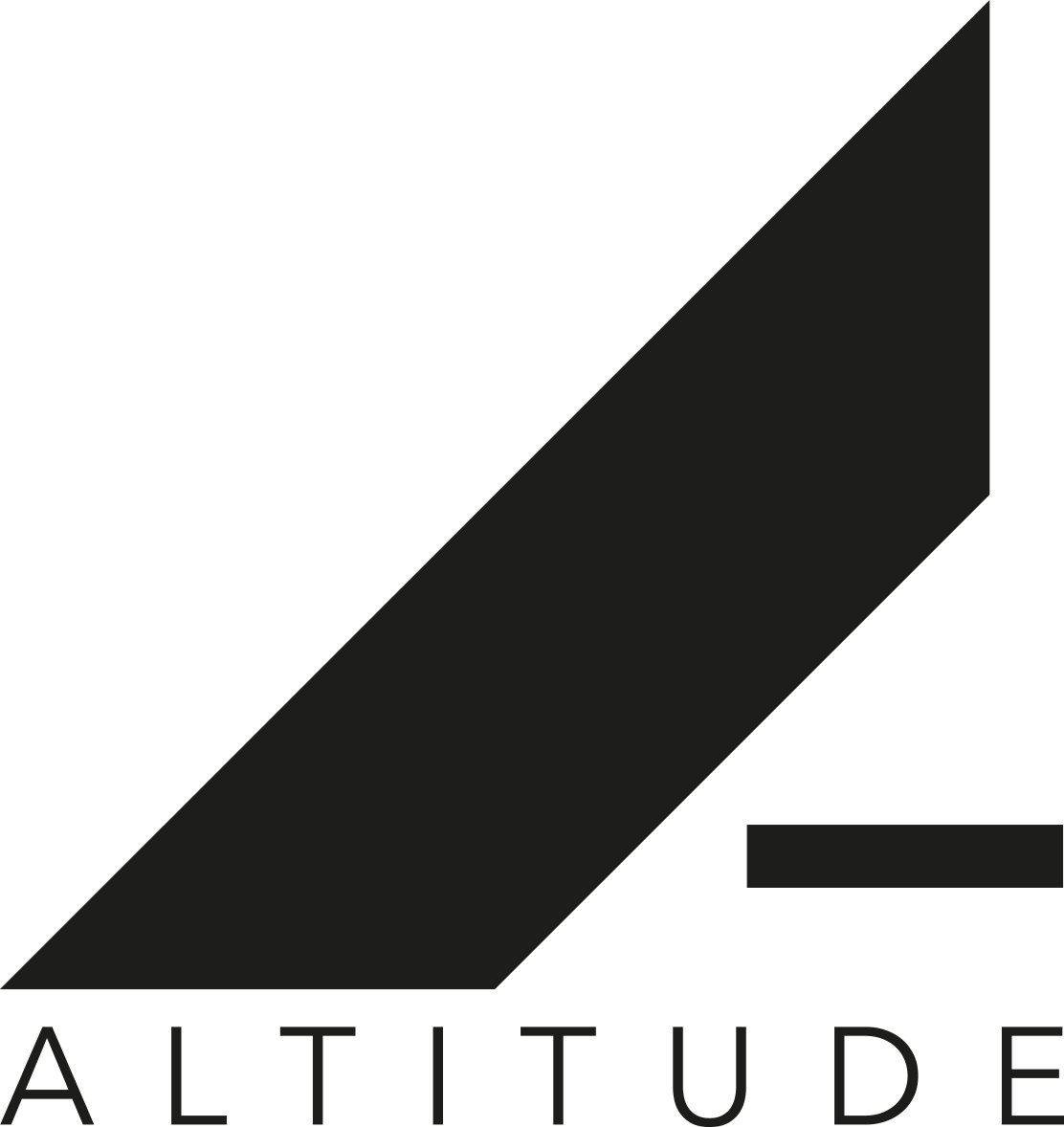
- Trade name: Altitude
- Type: Private
- Industry: Film
- Founded: 2012; 14 years ago
- Founder: Will Clarke
- Headquarters: England
- Products: Motion Pictures
- Services: Film distribution
- Parent: Altitude Film Entertainment
- Website: www.altitudefilment.com

Altitude Film Distribution is a British film distribution company, part of the Altitude Film Entertainment group. The parent company was launched in 2012 by Optimum Releasing founder Will Clarke. Altitude Film Entertainment is vertically integrated, with divisions that handle film production, finance and international sales, as well as UK distribution.

== History ==
Altitude Film Distribution's first release came in 2014 with the Oscar-winning documentary 20 Feet from Stardom, which was followed by Fruitvale Station and Abel Ferrara's Welcome to New York. In 2015, Altitude released Ira Sachs' Love Is Strange; a biopic film, Amy, about the British singer Amy Winehouse, which was directed by Asif Kapadia and was released in cinemas on 3 July 2015 in the United Kingdom; international espionage thriller Spooks: The Greater Good; and Narcopolis, a science fiction film. In 2016, they released Bolshoi Babylon, a behind-the-scenes portrait of Moscow's Bolshoi Theatre. On 27 April 2016 it was announced that Altitude would partner with the British Academy Award winning film director Kevin Macdonald, on a new documentary film on Whitney Houston's life and death. It was released in 2018. It's been revealed that the movie is to include rare unheard tracks & performances, with family members & friends to help build up the film through recorded interviews and archive footage.

In 2023, Altitude Film gave limited theatrical releases in the United Kingdom for Winnie-the-Pooh: Blood and Honey, a universally panned indie slasher film starring Nikolai Leon, Craig David Dowsett and Chris Cordell, and Wham!, a critically praised documentary film about the titular English pop duo consisting of George Michael and Andrew Ridgeley.

In 2024, Altitude Film released Winnie-the-Pooh: Blood and Honey 2, the sequel to Blood and Honey, starring Scott Chambers (who is also the film's producer) and Simon Callow. The film divided critics, but many of them considered it an improvement over its predecessor.

== Filmography ==
=== Select cinema releases ===
Title	Director	Release date
20 Feet From Stardom	Morgan Neville	28 March 2014
Fruitvale Station	Ryan Coogler	6 June 2014
A Promise	Patrice Leconte	1 August 2014
Welcome To New York	Abel Ferrara	8 August 2014
Love Is Strange	Ira Sachs	13 February 2015
White Bird in a Blizzard	Gregg Araki	6 March 2015
Spooks: The Greater Good	Bharat Nalluri	8 May 2015
The Connection	Cédric Jimenez	29 May 2015
Amy	Asif Kapadia	3 July 2015
Narcopolis	Justin Trefgarne	29 September 2015
A Nazi Legacy : What Our Father's Did	David Evans	6 November 2015
Bolshoi Babylon	Nick Read	8 January 2016
Moonlight	Barry Jenkins	17 February 2017
The Florida Project	Sean Baker	10 November 2017
Loveless	Andrey Zvyagintsev	24 January 2018
Whitney	Kevin Macdonald	6 July 2018
Monster Family	Holger Tappe	2 March 2018
Mary and the Witch's Flower	Hiromasa Yonebayashi	15 May 2018
Final Score	Scott Mann	4 September 2018
Black '47	Lance Daly	28 September 2018
Horrible Histories: The Movie – Rotten Romans	Dominic Brigstocke	26 July 2019
Little Monsters	Abe Forsythe	15 November 2019
Les Misérables	Ladj Ly	4 September 2020
Rocks	Sarah Gavron	18 September 2020
Minari	Lee Isaac Chung	17 May 2021
Gunda	Victor Kossakovsky	4 June 2021
Night of the Kings	Philippe Lacôte	23 July 2021
Pig	Michael Sarnoski	20 August 2021
Titane	Julia Ducournau	26 December 2021
Ali & Ava	Clio Barnard	4 March 2022
Hive	Blerta Basholli	18 March 2022
All the Beauty and the Bloodshed	Laura Poitras	27 January 2023
The Real Charlie Chaplin	James Middleton, James Spinney	18 February 2022
Blue Jean	Georgia Oakley	10 February 2023
Winnie-the-Pooh: Blood and Honey	Rhys Frake-Waterfield	15 February 2023
Wham!	Chris Smith	27 June 2023
Talk to Me	Danny and Michael Philippou	28 July 2023
Io capitano	Matteo Garrone	5 April 2024
Winnie-the-Pooh: Blood and Honey 2	Rhys Frake-Waterfield	7 June 2024
I'm Still Here	Walter Salles	21 February 2025
Peter Pan's Neverland Nightmare	Scott Chambers	24 February 2025
Bambi: The Reckoning	Dan Allen	22 August 2025
The Voice of Hind Rajab	Kaouther Ben Hania	16 January 2026
Nouvelle Vague	Richard Linklater	30 January 2026
Sirāt	Oliver Laxe	27 February 2026
Orwell: 2+2=5	Raoul Peck	27 March 2026
Charlie the Wonderdog	Shea Wageman	22 May 2026
A Private Life	Rebecca Zlotowski	26 June 2026
Turbulence	Claudio Fäh	6 July 2026
Pinocchio Unstrung	Rhys Frake-Waterfield	24 July 2026
Coyote vs. Acme	Dave Green	21 August 2026
Knife: The Attempted Murder of Salman Rushdie	Alex Gibney	30 September 2026
La bola negra	Javier Calvo & Javier Ambrossi	6 November 2026
The Leader	Michael Gallagher	TBA

=== Home entertainment releases ===
Title	Director
Flu	Sung-su Kim
Sx Tape	Bernard Rose
Dracula 3D	Dario Argento
All Cheerleaders Die	Lucky McKee, Chris Sivertson
Iceberg Slim	Jorge Hinojosa
Somm	Jason Wise
Narco Cultura	Shaul Schwarz
Torment	Jordan Barker
The Rendlesham UFO Incident	Daniel Simpson
Drew: The Man Behind The Poster	Erik Sharkey
Doc of the Dead	Alexandre O. Philippe
Wolves	David Hayter
Superfast!	Jason Friedberg, Aaron Seltzer
Colt 45	Fabrice Du Welz
The Dead 2	Howard J. Ford, Jonathan Ford
Zombie Fight Club	Joe Chien
The Match	Jakov Sedlar, Dominik Sedlar

== Altitude Film Entertainment ==
Altitude Film Entertainment
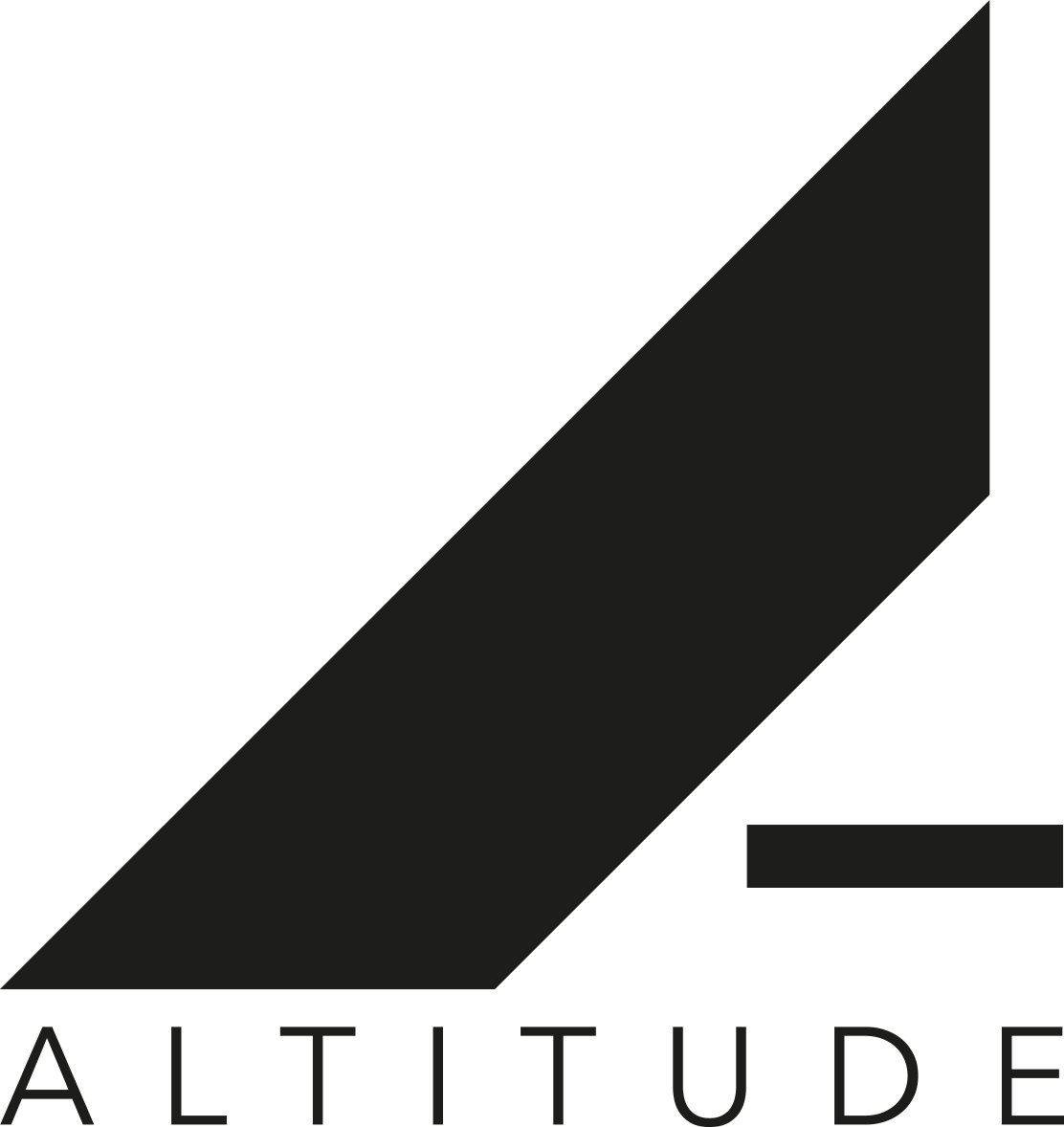
- Type: Private
- Industry: Motion picture
- Founded: 2012; 14 years ago
- Headquarters: United Kingdom
- Key people: Will Clarke (chairman & CEO); Andy Mayson (co-CEO); Mike Runagall (Management Director); Hamish Moseley (Managing Director)
- Owner: 30West (5%)
- Subsidiaries: Altitude Film Distribution; Altitude Film Production; Altitude Film Sales; Altitude Factual
- Website: www.altitudefilment.com

Altitude Film Entertainment is a British entertainment company. The company comprises Altitude Film Production led by Will Clarke chairman and joint-CEO with Andy Mayson; Altitude Film Sales with Managing Director Mike Runagall; and Altitude Film Distribution.

On 21 February 2020, 30West acquired a minority stake in Altitude Film Entertainment. On 4 March that same year, Altitude created Altitude Factual, a unit for natural history documentaries.
