= Pavel Dmitrichenko =

Russian ballet dancer (born 1984)

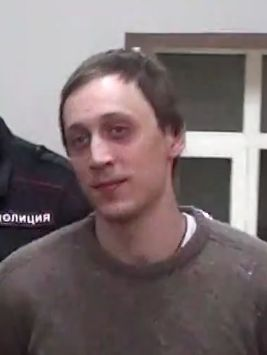
Image of Pavel

Pavel Vitalyevich Dmitrichenko (Russian: Па́вел Вита́льевич Дмитриче́нко; born 3 January 1984) is a Russian ballet dancer and formerly a leading soloist of the Bolshoi Theatre.

== Biography ==
Dmitrichenko was born on 3 January 1984 in Moscow into a family of artists, all members of the State Academic Folk Dance Ensemble under the direction of Igor Moiseyev.

In 2002, he graduated from the Moscow State Academy of Choreography and was accepted into the ballet company of the Bolshoi Theatre. In 2005, he graduated from the Institute of Russian theater.

He married his wife Yana while in prison.

== Roles ==
Among the roles he has played are: "Yasha" in the "Golden Age", the "Evil Genius" in "Swan Lake", "Abderrahmane" in "Raymonda", "Spartacus" in "Spartacus", "Jose" in "Carmen Suite", "Tybalt" in "Romeo and Juliet", "Hans" in "Giselle" and "Ivan" in "Ivan the Terrible".

== Prizes and awards ==
In 2004, Dmitrichenko received the diploma of the International Ballet Competition in Rome, Italy.

== Sergei Filin acid attack case ==
Dmitrichenko was arrested on 5 March 2013 in relation to the attack, of 17 January 2013, on the artistic director of the Bolshoi, Sergei Filin. According to the police an unknown assailant doused acid on the face of Filin. On 5 March, Dmitrichenko's home was searched. According to Moscow police, on 6 March, all three detainees wrote a confession. On 3 December 2013, Dmitrichenko was given a six-year prison sentence for his role in the attack. In March 2014, the conviction from December 2013 was canceled. The case was then reviewed. At the retrial the court refused Dmitrichenko's request to call witnesses in his defense and rendered a verdict quickly with the prosecution, resulting in a sentence of 5½ years, six months less than the original 2013 sentence.

Dmitrichenko was granted an early release from prison due to good behavior in May 2016 after serving 3 years of his sentence. Following a chance meeting with the Bolshoi's new artistic director, Makhar Vaziev, Dmitrichenko was granted a building pass and returned to the Bolshoi for morning practice routines only. General director Vladimir Urin stated after Dmitrichenko's release that the dancer could audition to rejoin the company provided there was an opening and provided he proved himself as an artist.

In April 2018 the opera company of the Bolshoi Theater elected him as chairman of the creative trade union of BT workers.
