= ILIS 1936 =

Swedish International Airport

1936 Stockholm
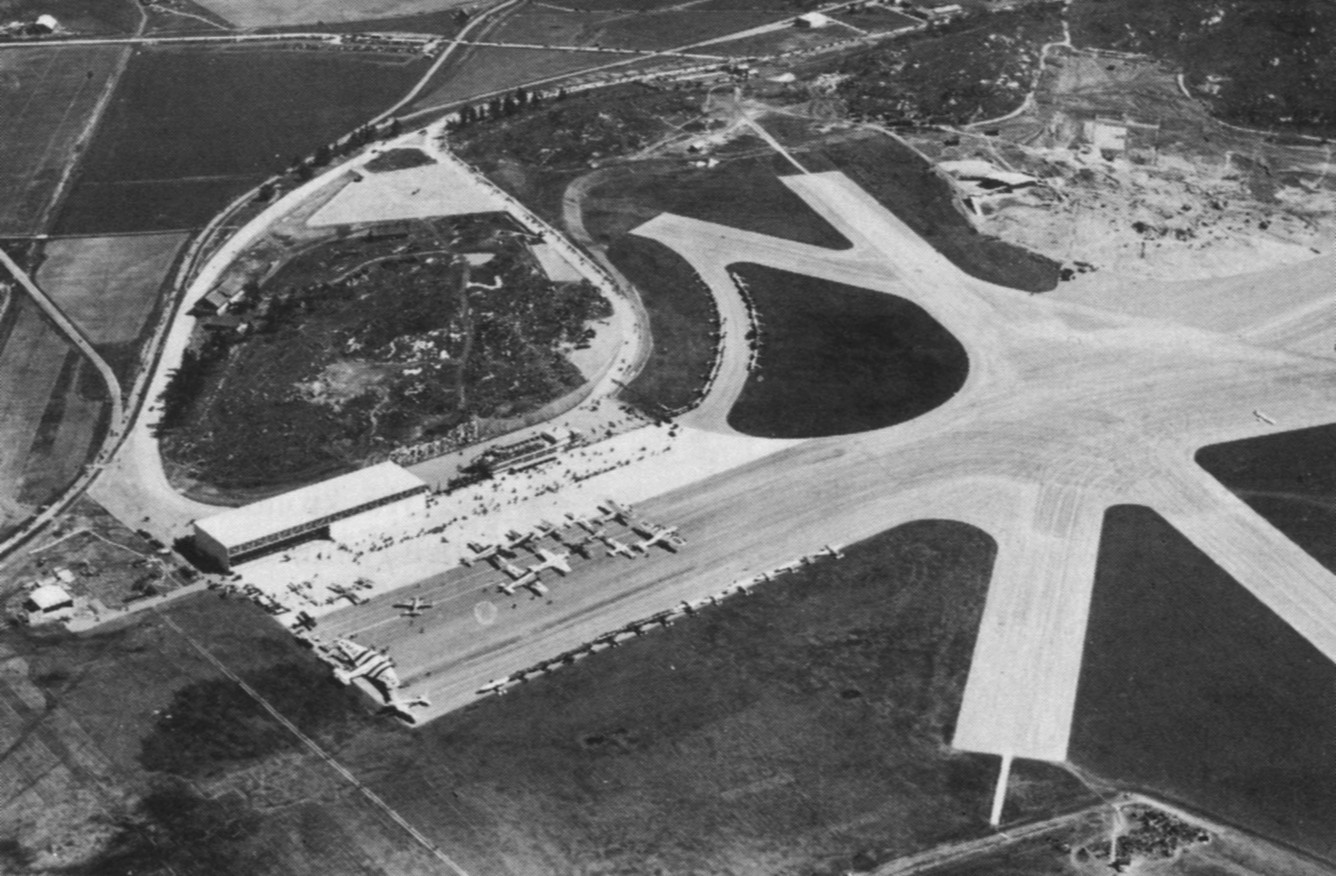
- The paved runways at Bromma in 1936

Overview
- BIE-class: Specialized exposition
- Name: Internationella Luftfartsutställningen i Stockholm
- Building(s): Stockholm Bromma Airport
- Area: 0.5 Ha

Participant(s)
- Countries: 8

Location
- Country: Sweden
- City: Stockholm
- Venue: Lindarängen
- Coordinates: 59°20.382′N 18°7.717′E

Timeline
- Awarded: October 23, 1934
- Opening: May 15, 1936
- Closure: June 1, 1936

Specialized expositions
- Next: Second International Aeronautic Exhibition in Helsinki

Universal
- Previous: Brussels International Exposition (1935) in Brussels
- Next: Exposition Internationale des Arts et Techniques dans la Vie Moderne in Paris

The ILIS 1936 (Swedish: Internationella Luftfartsutställningen i Stockholm) was an international aviation exhibition held at Lindarängen airport in the Swedish capital Stockholm between 15 May 1936 and 1 June 1936. It was the first specialised exhibition recognised by the Bureau International des Expositions (BIE). The exposition was held to celebrate the opening of Bromma airport, Europe's first with paved runways. Bromma was inaugurated on 23 May 1936, with the finish of an air race across Sweden that started the day before. At Bromma, some airshows took place on 24 and 25 May 1936. Visitors were transported between Lindarängen and Bromma by autogiro. The indoor and static exhibition was held at Lindarängen a flying boat facility just east of the city centre, currently used as ferry terminal. During the ILIS, visitors to Lindarängen could board a Swedish flying boat to fly over Stockholm.

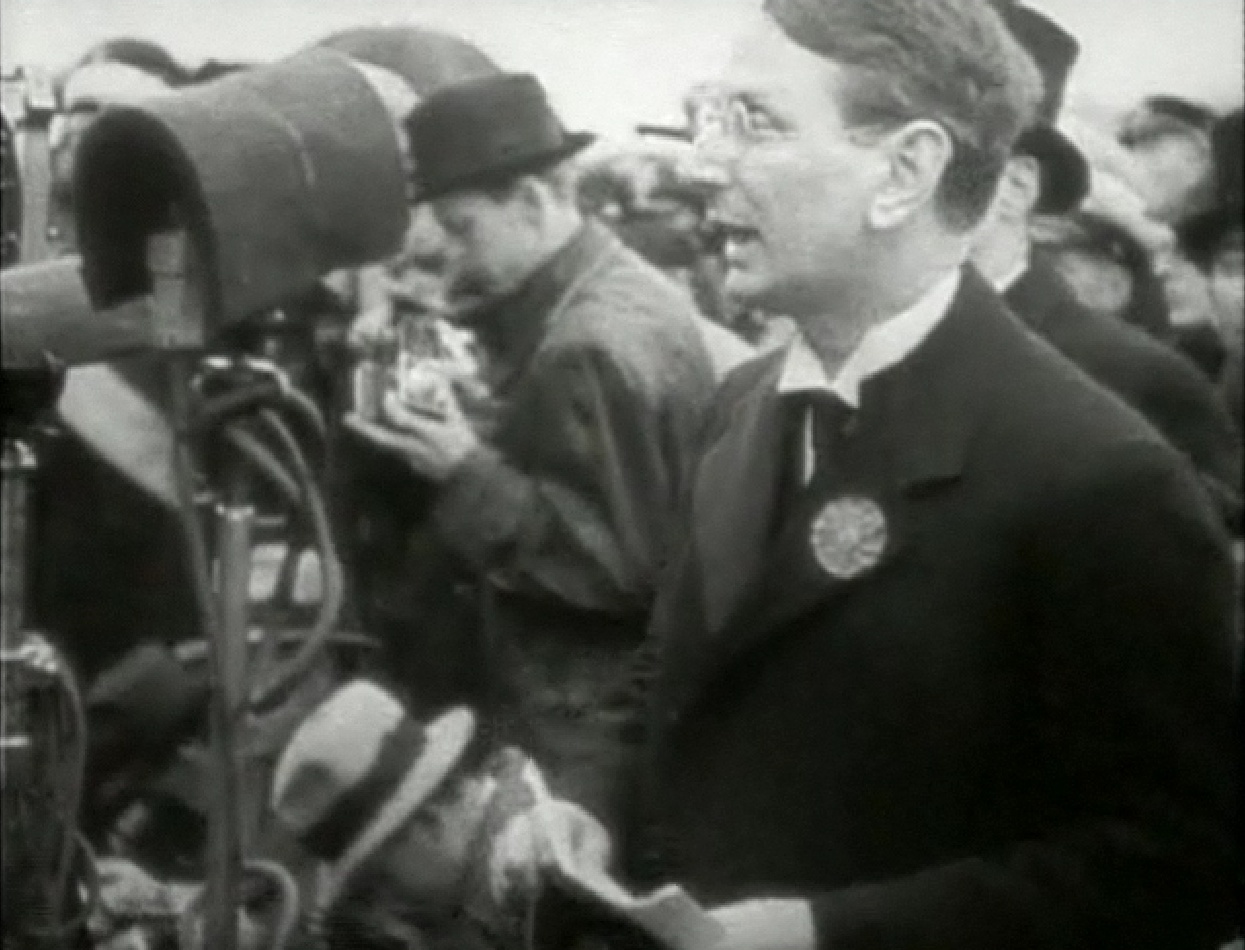
Opening of Bromma Airport by municipal commissioner Yngve Larsson

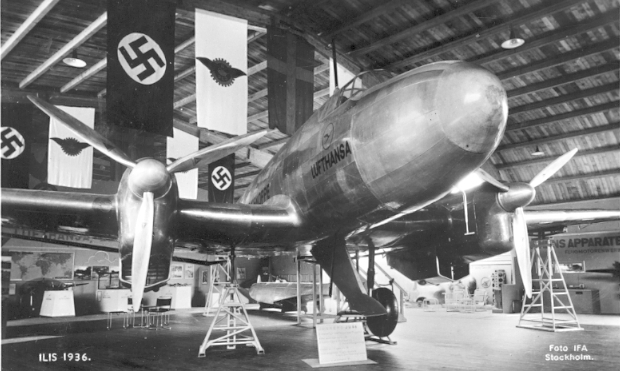
The ILIS indoor display at Lindarängen

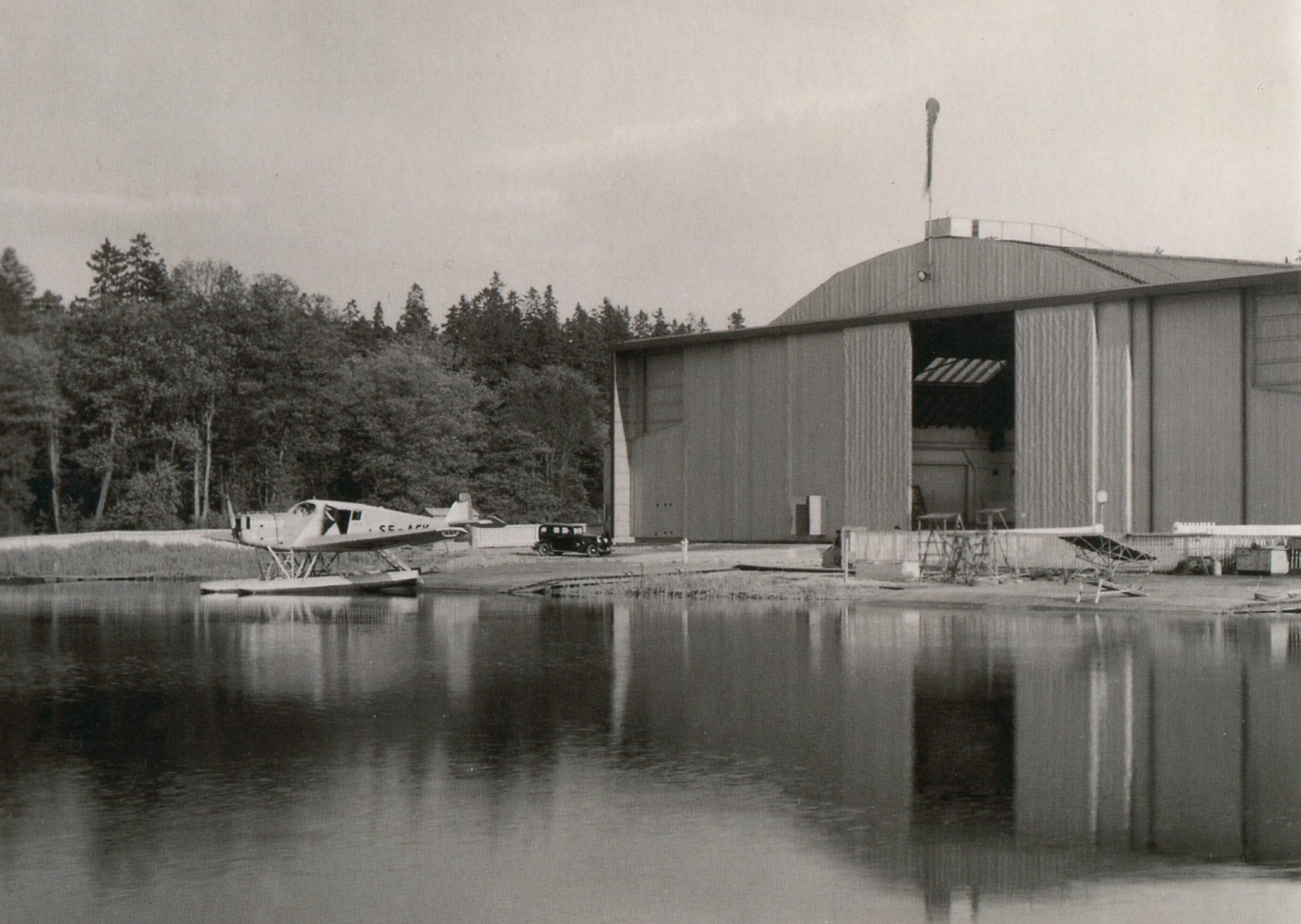
Lindarängen airport in 1930
