= Vladimir Urin =

Russian theatre director

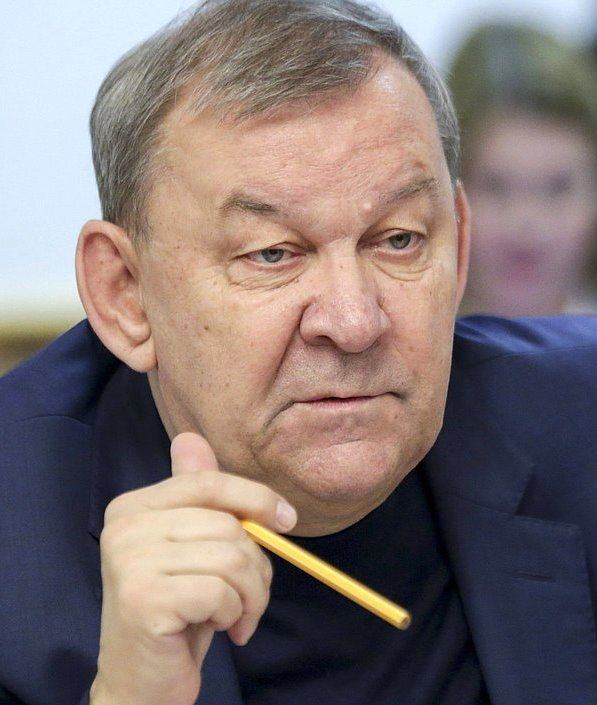
Vladimir Urin, 2018

Vladimir Georgievich Urin (Russian: Владимир Георгиевич Урин) is a People's Artists of Russia; a Musical Theatre of Stanislavsky and Nemirovich-Danchenko director (1995–2013), then Bolshoi Theatre director until 1 December 2023.

== Biography ==
Urin began his theatre career in 1973. In 1981 he moved to Moscow where he became in charge of the Youth and Puppet Theatres Department in Theater Union of Russia. Four years later, he graduated from the Russian Academy of Theatre Arts and from 1987 to 1996 was the secretary at the Theater Union of Russia where he also worked as deputy President. Prior to it, in 1991, he became First Deputy President there, but all of the rankings ended for him in 1996. In 1994 he was behind the creation of the Golden Mask award as a National Theatre Award. In 1995 he became general manager of Musical Theatre of Stanislavsky and Nemirovich-Danchenko and two years later held the same position at the International Festival of Contemporary Dance. In 2013, after the scandals inside the Bolshoi theatre and the attack on Artistic Director Sergei Filin, he was appointed as General Director of the Bolshoi Theatre, replacing Anatoly Iksanov.

July 8, 2017, three days before the first night Urin called off the premiere of a ballet Nureyev about legendary dancer Rudolf Nureyev. He claimed it was due to the bad quality of the dancing. It was the first time a show has been pulled in such a way since the collapse of the Soviet Union, sparking rumours about the motivation behind it.

== Political involvement ==
In March 2014, Urin joined a host of other Russian arts and cultural figures in signing an open letter of support for Vladimir Putin's politics in Ukraine and Crimea. Signatories stated that they "firmly state support for the position of the president of the Russian Federation" in the region. The letter was posted on the website of Russia's culture ministry on March 12, 2014, few days before the annexation of Crimea by the Russian Federation.

In February 2022, Urin was among the signatories of a petition by cultural leaders calling on Putin to stop the ongoing Russo-Ukrainian War. The petition states: "We call on everyone on whom it depends, all sides of the conflict, to stop the armed action, and to sit at the table for negotiations. We call for the preservation of the highest value – human life." Other signatories included Vladimir Spivakov, Konstantin Raikin, Yevgeny Mironov, Valery Fokin and Alisa Freindlich. On November 30, 2023, he resigned from his position as director of the Bolshoi Theater in Moscow without explanation.
