= Maria Alexandrova =

Russian ballet dancer

- Мария Александрова
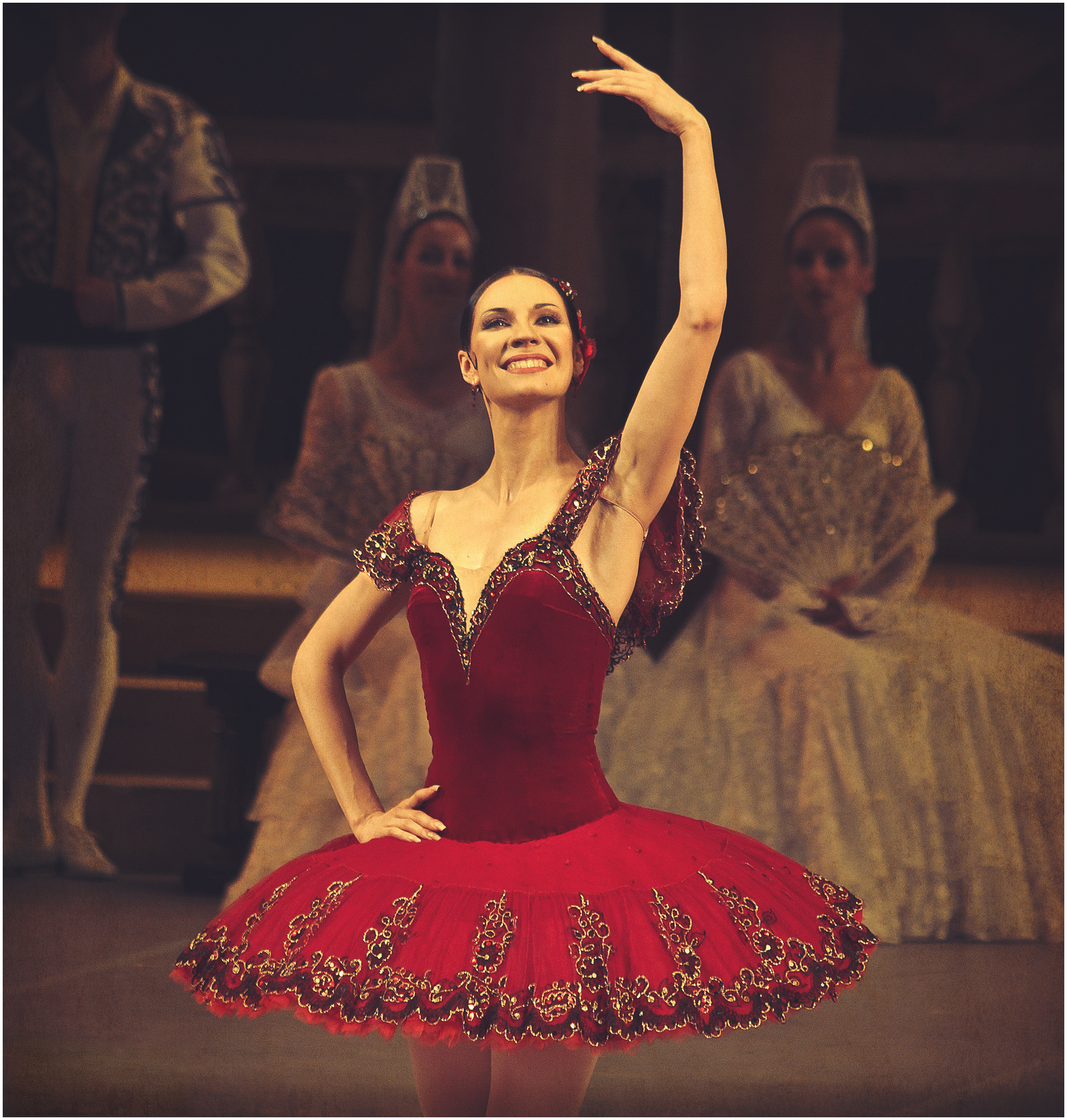
- Maria Alexandrova in Don Quixote, Bolshoi Theatre, 2011
- Born: Maria Aleksandrovna Alexandrova; 20 July 1978 (age 47); Moscow, Russian SFSR, Soviet Union
- Education: Moscow State Academy of Choreography
- Occupation: Ballerina
- Employer: Bolshoi Theatre
- Awards: Golden Mask (2004); Meritorious Artist of Russia (2005); People's Artist of Russia (2009)

Maria Aleksandrovna Alexandrova (Russian: Мари́я Алекса́ндровна Алекса́ндрова; born 20 July 1978) is a Russian principal dancer of the Bolshoi Ballet, People’s Artist of Russia.

== Biography ==
Alexandrova was born in Moscow, Russian SFSR, and attended the Moscow Choreographic Academy. She won a gold medal at the Moscow International Ballet Competition in 1997 and shortly thereafter joined the Bolshoi Ballet, quickly making her debut as Myrtha in Giselle. In June 2000, she played a double role in Don Quixote as street dancer for the first act and as soloist in third. By 2004, she had become a principal dancer, and since then she has performed in such ballets as The Sleeping Beauty and played the title character in Alexei Ratmansky's Leah and Carmen in Carmen Suite. In 2005 and 2007, she performed numerous soloist roles and made her debuts as Odette-Odile in Swan Lake, Medora in Le Corsaire and the Pupil in The Lesson.

In 2008, she participated in the premiere of Ratmansky's Flames of Paris, in which she played the heroine Jeanne. In 2009, she danced in the premiere of Coppélia as Swanilda, made her debut as Nikiya in La Bayadère and danced the title role in the premiere of Esmeralda. The same year, she also traveled to Novosibirsk where she appeared again in Swan Lake and Don Quixote, both of which were performed at the Novosibirsk Opera and Ballet Theatre. In 2010, she made her debut as the Countess in Roland Petit's Queen of Spades. On 2 August 2013, during a performance by the Bolshoi Ballet at the Royal Opera House in London, Alexandrova injured her leg while performing Gamzatti in La Bayadère and had to leave the stage without finishing her act. She returned to the Bolshoi stage on 28 February 2014 in a performance of Mats Ek's Apartment.

In 2015, Alexandrova had participated in a film called Bolshoi Babylon.

On 2 February 2017, it was officially announced that Alexandrova decided to resign from the Bolshoi Ballet. "Bolshoi Theater has confirmed resignation of one of the ballet company stars, internationally acclaimed prima ballerina Maria Alexandrova. The resignation was voluntary" said TASS. "On January 19, 2017, People's Artist of Russia Maria Alexandrova filed a request for voluntary resignation," a spokesperson for the theater said. "This was Ms. Alexandrova's personal decision." Alexandrova explained she will continue to dance within the context of other projects.

Alexandrova was a leader of the Bolshoi Theatre's performer's union, and on 14 September 2014 she ran unsuccessfully for election to the Moscow City Duma as a candidate from the Communist Party of the Russian Federation, finishing second in the 41st electoral district.

== See also ==
- List of Russian ballet dancers
