= Lawrence Adams (dancer) =

Dancer, archivist and publisher

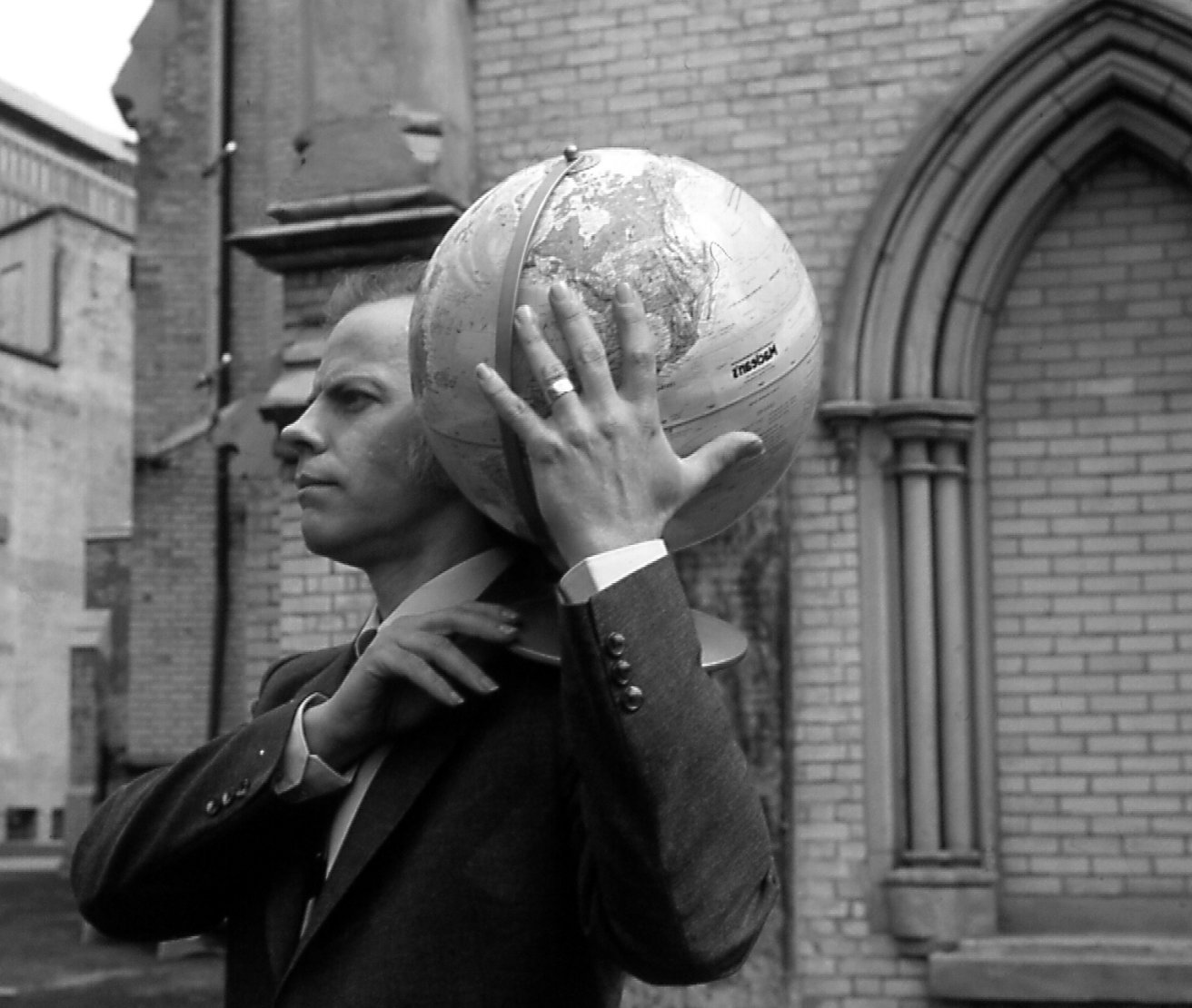
- Born: 2 November 1936; St. Boniface, Manitoba, Canada
- Died: 26 February 2003 (aged 66); Toronto, Ontario, Canada
- Occupations: dancer, archivist, dance presenter, publisher
- Known for: Co-founder of Dance Collection Danse

Lawrence Vaughan Adams was a Canadian dancer, archivist and publisher. He was a member of the National Ballet of Canada from 1955 to 1960, and also performed with Les Grands Ballets Canadiens and New York's Joffrey Ballet. In 1963, he rejoined the National Ballet of Canada as a soloist and then, principal dancer, leaving the company in 1969.

Adams was the co-founder, with wife and collaborator Miriam Adams, of the experimental Toronto performance space 15 Dance Lab, and the dance reconstruction project Encore! Encore!; and with John Faichney he co-founded The Arts Television Centre. In 1983, the Adams pair established Dance Collection Danse, a publishing company and archives dedicated to preserving Canadian dance history.

== Early life and education ==
Adams was born in the English-speaking neighbourhood of Norwood in St. Boniface, Manitoba on November 2, 1936. He had three siblings, including David Adams, who became a prominent ballet dancer. When the family moved to Vancouver, Adams studied ballet with Mara McBirney. When he was 15, Adams joined his brother David and sister-in-law, ballerina Lois Smith, in Toronto. A 1957 Maclean's magazine article describes their home as a makeshift studio-workshop where Lawrence and his brother did carpentry, experimented with film and video equipment and discussed the beginnings of a Canadian dance archive. While living in Toronto, Adams studied with local teacher Boris Volkoff. At 16, he made his professional debut with the Toronto Theatre Ballet in a performance in Midland, Ontario. Adams danced the role of Rothbart in excerpts of Swan Lake.

== Dance career ==
Adams joined the National Ballet of Canada as a member of the corps de ballet in 1955. He left the National in 1960, but returned in 1963 as a Principal dancer. Notable roles included Gurn in La Sylphide (Erik Bruhn after A. Bournonville), Mercutio in Romeo and Juliet (John Cranko), The Prince in The Nutcracker (Celia Franca after Marius Petipa), The Rake in The Rake’s Progress (Ninette de Valois), The Prince in Swan Lake (Celia Franca after M. Petipa and L. Ivanov), Solor in La Bayadère (Marius Petipa produced by E. Valukin), and Hilarion in Giselle (Celia Franca after J. Coralli). His television appearances with the National Ballet of Canada included Offenbach in the Underworld, Swan Lake (Erik Bruhn), Cinderella, Romeo and Juliet, Pineapple Poll, Winter Night (Antony Tudor), and Giselle. Adams left the National for good in 1969, turning his attention to writing, teaching, publishing and presenting contemporary dance.

Adams joined Les Grands Ballet Canadiens in 1961. He stayed there for a year, performing a main role in Labyrinth by choreographer Eric Hyrst. For the rest of the company's repertoire, he danced in the corps de ballet.

In 1963 Adams joined the Robert Joffrey Theatre Ballet (now Joffrey Ballet), then based in New York City. He went on an extended tour with them to Lisbon, Amman, Jordan, Ramallah and East Jerusalem, Damascus, Beirut, Kabul and Teheran, followed by an 8-week tour of India.

At around the same time Adams returned to the National Ballet of Canada in 1963, he opened an antique shop in Toronto's Mirvish Village with fellow dancer Yves Cousineau. They called it Adams and Yves. The store sold pieces of Adams’ refurbished furniture, which he worked on in a carpentry workshop at St. Lawrence Hall. In time, they opened up a gallery, print and framing shop across the street from the antique shop.

By the time Adams left his second stint at the National Ballet of Canada in 1969, he had met and married fellow dancer Miriam Weinstein, his life-long partner in many creative projects. Together they kept the Adams and Yves gallery going while also teaching class at the newly opened Lois Smith School of Dance. The gallery space connected the Adamses to Toronto's nascent visual arts scene, and that networking impacted their next major projects together: 15 Dancers and 15 Dance Lab.

== 15 Dance Lab ==
In 1972, Lawrence and Miriam Adams created the 15 Dancers project, working with students from the Lois Smith School of Dance. Experimenting with the possibilities of contemporary ballet choreography, the group innovated with text, improvisation, and humour, among other things. Their shows at Toronto's Poor Alex Theatre, and on tour to the National Arts Centre in Ottawa, pushed the boundaries of contemporary dance in Canada. At home in Toronto, they built a tiny black box performance venue in a disused factory space. As 15 Dancers disbanded in 1974, their space on Britain Street became known as 15 Dance Laboratorium (or, 15 Dance Lab). It would prove to be a vital hub for independent dance artists, presenting original performance art, environmental dance, site-specific work and experimental video for six years, closing in 1980.

The artists who created and performed works at 15 Dance Lab make for a notable dance history roster. Among them were David Earle, Jean-Pierre Perreault, Jennifer Mascall, Marie Chouinard, Anna Blewchamp, Christopher House, Judith Marcuse, Margie Gillis, Peggy Baker, Peter Boneham and Judy Jarvis.

== Media Ventures ==
Adams was enthusiastic about video production and media when those forms were in their infancy as vehicles for artistic expression. He, Miriam and video artist Terry McGlade established The Visus Foundation in 1974 as a dance-focused video production organisation. The foundation recorded dance videos and presented a weekly cable TV arts broadcast. In 1981, the Adamses submitted a proposal to license a Toronto arts and culture channel for pay TV. Though not successful in acquiring a licence, The Arts Television Centre (ATC) operated from 1984 to 1990. With performer, television producer and software analyst John Faichney as manager, the Centre sought to familiarise artists with television production, while also serving as a rental facility for corporate video. Adams' early interest in computer technology and digital publishing would push his work in dance performance and video into new realms as innovative ideas about archiving, digital and print media began to circulate.

== Publishing ==
As an early adopter of computer technology, Adams developed software and learned to scan photographs and historical artifacts from dance history. In the late 80s, he published dance articles online using a dial-up computer-to-computer BBS (Bulletin Board System) called The Arts Network. Lawrence and Miriam also took over a University of Waterloo project, The Dictionary of Theatre Dance in Canada, and published it first as a floppy disk and then in print as an encyclopaedia. Even earlier, the Adamses had established regular print contributions with the dance and performance magazines Spill (1976-1978) and Canadian Dance News (1980-1983). Concurrently, they offered a typesetting and layout service called LAMA Labs to the Toronto cultural community (1977-1980). These endeavours reinforced the Adamses' commitment to preserving Canadian dance history through a variety of means, work that is ongoing to this day.

== Encore! Encore! ==
In 1983, the Adamses began researching Canada's early dance history, and the artists who pre-dated the founding of institutions such as the National Ballet of Canada (1951) and the Canada Council for the Arts (1957). Choreographic works from pioneers such as Gweneth Lloyd (co-founder of the Royal Winnipeg Ballet) and Françoise Sullivan were in danger of being forgotten completely, they believed. Using cross-Canada field research and interviews collected by Saskatchewan dance teacher Sonja Barton, and funding from the Laidlaw Foundation, the Adamses embarked on a large-scale dance reconstruction project they called Encore!Encore! Over a six-week period in 1986, a handful of early dance works, including Shadow on the Prairie by Gweneth Lloyd, Red Ear of Corn by Boris Volkoff, Maria Chapdelaine by Nesta Toumine and Déformité, Moi je suis... by Françoise Sullivan and Jeanne Renaud, were reconstructed, videotaped and notated by a team that included many of the original choreographers and performers.

A multi-media performance based on the Adamses' Encore Encore! research was presented at Expo '86 in Vancouver. There's Always Been Dance introduced Canadian Pavilion visitors to the country's vibrant theatrical dance history using live performance, film, video and photographs. The complex production toured several cities in Western Canada at the end of its Expo run.

== Dance Collection Danse ==
An organic extension of Miriam and Lawrence Adams’ work in Canadian dance history, Dance Collection Danse (DCD) began official operations in 1986. An archive of photographs, costumes, scrapbooks, souvenir programs, letters, poster and company records, DCD is also Canada's only dedicated publisher focused on dance.

Housed in Miriam and Lawrence Adams’ own home until 2013, DCD commissioned, edited and published both print and electronic newsletters and books, including the Dictionary of Dance: Words, Terms and Phrases (edited by Susan Macpherson 1996), the Dictionary of Classical Ballet Terms - Cecchetti (Rhonda Ryman 1998) and Theatrical Dance in Vancouver, 1880s - 1920s (Kaija Pepper 2000). Several early editions were published on the short-lived 5 1/4-inch floppy disk format, an indication of Lawrence's ongoing love affair with technology of all kinds. By contrast, Lawrence also bound several books by hand for limited editions that include early copies of Maud Allan and Her Art by Felix Cherniavsky.

Since Lawrence's death in 2003, DCD has continued to grow. Along with Miriam, his mentee Amy Bowring took over some of his tasks, including the design and printing of several new books. Instrumental in opening DCD's new research centre and exhibition space in 2013 to showcase highlights from a growing collection, Bowring now continues as Executive and Curatorial Director.

== Awards ==
- Dance Ontario Lifetime Achievement Award 1981 (with Miriam Adams)
- Dance in Canada Service Award 1985
