= Miriam Adams =

Canadian dancer, choreographer and archivist (born 1944)

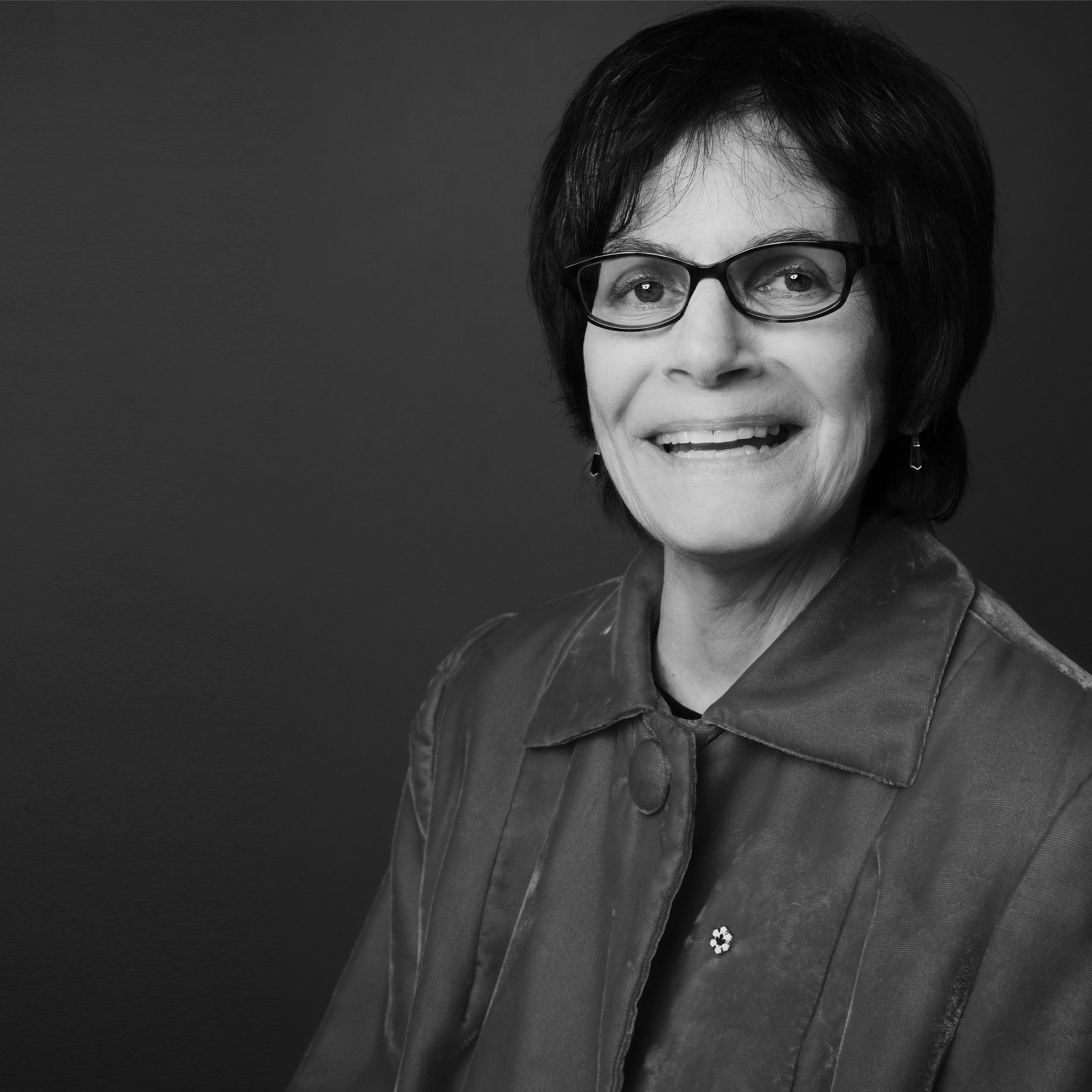
- Photo/Liliana Reyes
- Born: Miriam Elaine Adams (née Weinstein); January 29, 1944 (age 82); Toronto, Ontario, Canada
- Known for: Dancer; Choreographer; Archivist; Publisher
- Movement: Ballet; Modern/Contemporary dance

Miriam Elaine Adams CM (née Weinstein; born January 29, 1944) is a dancer, choreographer, and dance archivist from Toronto. After performing with the National Ballet of Canada, she co-founded 15 Dance Laboratorium with her husband Lawrence Adams. It was the first theatre to present experimental dance in Toronto. In 1983, Miriam and Lawrence launched Encore! Encore! to document the works of six Canadian choreographers from the 1940s and 1950s, and in 1986 they launched a centre for archiving dance and publishing books called Arts Inter-Media Canada/Dance Collection Danse (DCD).

== Early life and training ==
Miriam Adams was born in Toronto on January 29, 1944. She studied with Betty Oliphant and became a student at the National Ballet School in 1960, graduating in 1963.

== Early career and 15 Dance Lab ==
From 1963 to 1969, Adams performed with the National Ballet of Canada as a member of the corps de ballet. While there she met her husband, principal dancer Lawrence Adams.

After leaving the National Ballet of Canada, Adams taught at the Lois Smith School of Dance. In 1972, Adams and Lawrence formed a dance company called 15 Dancers which evolved into 15 Dance Lab, a 41-seat studio theatre in Toronto, and the first to present experimental dance in Toronto. The Adamses wanted to avoid the hierarchical structures experienced in ballet companies and instead promoted the independence of dancers representing various styles of dance. In 1974, Adams and Lawrence incorporated 15 Dance Lab as a not-for-profit charitable organisation. They received various grants for their organisation which allowed them to pay artists 80% of the box office revenue, plus a fee for performances.

== Choreographic works ==
Adams' choreographic works contained humour, parody and satire of current events. Her first choreographic piece with 15 Dancers was, ode to yogurt on June 13, 1972. She choreographed Another Nutcracker in 1973, which parodied The Nutcracker. In 1975 she satirised the defection of Mikhail Baryshnikov from the Soviet Union in a video called Sonovovitch.

In 1990, Adams choreographed and composed the score for So What’s This Got To Do With God Already? for Inde / 90 at Toronto's Harbourfront Centre, a humorous perspective of Jewish culture featuring modern dance, ballet, ballroom, and basketball movements.

== Publishing and archiving ==
From 1976 to 1978, Adams and Lawrence published the tabloid Spill, edited by Elizabeth Chitty. In 1979, they published a dance photography book with visual artist Lynn Rotin entitled Photographs Dance. From 1980 to 1983, they published a monthly newspaper called Canadian Dance News. During this time Adams also worked as a conference and special projects coordinator for the Dance in Canada Association.

In 1983, Adams and her husband created Encore! Encore! to reconstruct dances by six choreographers from the 1940s and 1950s. Former dancers, choreographers and notators assisted to reconstruct, videotape and record these works through dance notation. The couple chose works whose choreography, costumes and musical scores were created in Canada and performed by Canadian dancers. The choreographers were Gweneth Lloyd of Winnipeg, Jeanne Renaud and Françoise Sullivan of Montreal, Nesta Toumine of Ottawa, and Boris Volkoff and Nancy Lima Dent of Toronto. The couple worked with Lawrence's brother, David Adams, to reconstruct Boris Volkoff’s The Red Ear of Corn. Their production, There's Always Been Dance incorporated excerpts and images of these reconstructed works and was performed in Vancouver at Expo 86.

In 1986, Adams and Lawrence created the Encore! Dance Hall of Fame to honour Canadian dancers and choreographers. They also renamed their organisation Arts Inter-Media Canada / Dance Collection Danse (DCD), establishing it as an archive, museum and publisher. The first iteration of the archives was hosted in the Adams' home. DCD published over 40 books, including a bilingual Encyclopedia of Theatre Dance in Canada.

Adams acted as its director until 2019, remaining part of the organisation as co-founder and advisor.

== Personal life ==
Adams married Lawrence Adams in 1967.

== Awards ==
In 1980, Adams and her husband won the Dance Ontario Award for providing opportunities for independent choreographers to showcase work at 15 Dance Lab.

- Dance in Canada Service Award, 1988
- Medal of Service, City of Toronto, 1992
- Rita Davies and Margo Bindhardt Cultural Leadership Award, 2009
- Queen Elizabeth Diamond Jubilee Medal, 2012
- Ken McCarter Award for Distinguished National Ballet School Alumni, 2021

In 2011, Adams was named a member of the Order of Canada for "contributions to preserving and popularising Canadian dance history."
