= Canadian Conference of the Arts =

Canadian not-for-profit organization

The Canadian Conference of the Arts (the CCA) was an Ottawa-based, not-for-profit, member-driven organization that represented the interests of over 400,000 artists, cultural workers and supporters from all disciplines of the nation's arts, culture and heritage community.

The CCA served the arts and cultural community in Canada by providing research, analysis and consultations on public policies affecting the arts and Canadian cultural institutions and industries. The CCA was active on many fronts to advance the relevance of the arts in Canadian society.

In September 2019, the CCA's activities were assumed by Mass Culture / Mobilisation culturelle, a Canadian arts research network that strives to harness the power of research to learn and generate new insights, enabling the arts community to be strategic, focused and adaptive.

== History ==
The CCA was founded in 1958, when the Canadian Arts Council adopted a new name at the same time as it submitted papers of incorporation. The name was one of several submitted to the federal government for consideration.

== Canadian Arts Council ==
The Canadian Arts Council was founded in December 1945 by a coalition of sixteen arts organizations to be an advocate for artists of all disciplines. The birth of a national organization representing the interests of Canadian artists of all disciplines can be traced to the formation of the House of Commons Special Committee on Reconstruction and Re-establishment in 1942. This committee was one of several charged with identifying issues likely to face the country following the end of the Second World War and solutions reflective of Canada's post-war prosperity and global influence.

Fifteen major cultural organizations met in Toronto in 1944 in order to draft a report for the committee on how the federal government ought to intervene in Canadian artistic and cultural development. Their three-part report, "Brief Concerning the Cultural Aspects of Canadian Reconstruction," called for, among other things, the formation of a non-partisan national body to support and oversee the arts in Canada and the establishment of community arts centres across the country. During 1945, the coalition resolved that some kind of permanent association would be beneficial. The Canadian Arts Council was formed with the mandate to "act in collaboration [. . .] on matters affecting the common interests of the member societies."

The council pushed for government action on issues pertaining to Canadian arts and culture, including making a presentation to the Royal Commission on National Development in the Arts, Letters and Sciences in 1949.

Following the formation of the Canada Council for the Arts, the Canadian Arts Council renamed itself the CCA in 1958.

== Activities ==
The CCA has organized conferences and spoken out on all major Canadian policy proposals pertaining to arts, culture and heritage since its formation. Highlights include:

- Twelve years of CCA leadership were rewarded with the adoption of federal Status of the Artist legislation in 1992;
- Also in the 1990s, the CCA created the Cultural Sector Training Committee to improve work and training opportunities for members of the cultural labour force. The committee later became independent of the CCA as the Cultural Human Resources Council;
- The CCA was the incubator and administrator of the national ArtsSmarts program from its creation in 1998 to 2005, when the Canadian Education Association took over;
- The CCA was a founding member of the Governor General's Performing Arts Awards Foundation, alongside the National Arts Centre, the Canada Council for the Arts and the Canadian Broadcasting Corporation (1992);
- The CCA participated actively in the development and adoption of the UNESCO Convention on the Protection and Promotion of the Diversity of Cultural Expressions (2005);
- Most recently, the CCA demonstrated its role as convener by bringing together 98 cultural organizations from coast to coast to support a common message to the government regarding copyright reform. This led to a presentation to Parliament of a series of amendments that reflected a large consensus in the cultural sector regarding this issue.
- The CCA was one of numerous organizations opposing the decision of the federal government to make the long-form version of the 2011 Canadian census optional.

== Closure ==
On October 30, 2012, the Canadian Conference of the Arts released a press release announcing that it would be discontinuing operations. The release identified this decision was due to the loss of federal government support, which the organization had received regularly since the 1960s, and which during its final years accounted for approximately 60-70 per cent of its total operating budget. Responding to indications in spring 2012 that the federal government intended to fundamentally change its funding model, the CCA sought to redefine its business model and become an organization completely independent of government. The organization requested two years' worth of transitional funding from the Department of Canadian Heritage, but given six months of funding. Unable to convert its model within this timeframe, the CCA decided to cease its operations as of November 2, 2012.

The CCA has left its research, archives and ongoing projects in the hands of a volunteer trustee board, with the intention that another cultural or academic organization will be able to continue its work in future. As of 2019, the CCA's charitable number has been assumed by Mass Culture / Mobilisation culturelle (MC), a national arts research organization. MC continues with CCA's work of mobilizing arts research across Canada.

== CCA Awards ==
Since 1954, the CCA has given awards to members of Canada's cultural community who have made significant contributions to the spirit and vitality of arts and culture in Canada. The list of recipients reads like a Who's Who of the Canadian cultural sector.

The Diplôme d'honneur is presented annually to a Canadian who has made a sustained contribution to the cultural life of the country, whether through volunteer activity, mentoring, patronage, individual arts practice or other recognized support. The Keith Kelly Award for Cultural Leadership has been awarded annually since 1998, when it was established to recognize the leadership shown by the former national director of the CCA during his tenure from 1989 to 1998. It is presented to a Canadian who has made a significant contribution to the arts through advocacy work or the development of cultural policy, or who has otherwise demonstrated leadership in the field.

== List of recipients of the Diplôme d'honneur ==
- 1954 Vincent Massey, C.C., C.H.*
- 1956 Tom Patterson, O.C.*
- 1957 Jean Bruchési*
- 1958 Walter Herbert, O.C.*
- 1959 Senator Donald Cameron, O.C.*
- 1960 Honourable Brooke Claxton*
- 1961 Iby Koerner, O.C.*
- 1962 William A. Riddell, O.C.*
- 1965 Albert Trueman, O.C.*
- 1968 Marius Barbeau, C.C.*
- 1969 Alan Jarvis*
- 1970 Wilfrid Pelletier, C.C. *
- 1971 Peter Dwyer, O.C.*
- 1972 Alain Grandbois, C.C. *
- 1973 Donald Wetmore, C.M. *
- 1974 Erik Bruhn*; Floyd S. Chalmers, C.C., O.Ont. *; Esse W. Ljungh, C.M. *; Mariette Rousseau-Vermette, O.C.*
- 1975 Ludmilla Chiriaeff, C.C.*; S.C. Eckhardt-Gramatté*; Tanya Moiseiwitsch*; Oscar Peterson, C.C.*; Robert Weaver, O.C. *; Moncrieff Williamson, C.M. *
- 1976 Glenn Gould*; Florence James *; Félix Leclerc, O.C. *; Félix-Antoine Savard, O.C. *
- 1977 Ernest Lindner, O.C. *; Alfred Pellan, C.C. *; Barbara Pentland*
- 1978 Gilles Lefebvre, O.C.*; Barker Fairley, O.C. *; Norman McLaren, C.C. *; Norma Springford*
- 1979 Arthur Gelber, C.C., O.Ont. *; Bill Reid*; Yvonne Hubert*
- 1980 Père Émile Legault, O.C. *; Maureen Forrester, C.C. *; Gabrielle Roy, C.C. *
- 1981 Maxwell Bates, C.M.*; Robert Fulford, O.C.; Antonine Maillet, C.C.; Hon. Pauline McGibbon, C.C.*
- 1982 Betty Oliphant, C.C.*; Louis Archambault, O.C. *; G. Hamilton Southam, O.C.*; Mario Bernardi, C.C.
- 1983 Anita Aarons*; Pierrette Alarie, C.C.*; Lyell Gustin*; Léopold Simoneau, C.C.*; Arnold Spohr, C.C.*
- 1984 Jean-Paul Riopelle, C.C. *; Stan Rogers*
- 1985 Joan Chalmers, C.C., O.Ont., A.O.C.A.; Gilles Hénault*; Mavor Moore, C.C.*
- 1986 Celia Franca, C.C.*; Jean Papineau-Couture, O.C. *
- 1987 Gratien Gélinas, C.M.*; Dorothy Burnham, C.M.*
- 1988 Eva Cleland*; Robertson Davies, C.C.*
- 1989 Gweneth Lloyd, O.C. *; Betty Farrally*; Frédéric Back, O.C.; Herman Voaden, C.M. *
- 1990 Malcolm Ross, O.C. *; André Fortier
- 1991 Nicholas Goldschmidt, C.C., O.Ont., L.L.D. *
- 1992 Paul Siren, C.M. *
- 1993 Michael M. Koerner, C.M.
- 1994 Charles Dutoit, O.C.
- 1995 Phyllis Lambert, C.C., C.Q., FRAIC, RCA, LL.D
- 1996 John Beckwith, C.M.
- 1997 J. Alan Wood
- 1998 Dr. Louis Applebaum, C.C. *
- 1999 John Hobday, C.M.
- 2000 Peter Herrndorf, O.C.
- 2001 Vincent Tovell, O.C.
- 2002 Pierre Juneau, O.C.*
- 2003 Pierre Raphaël Pelletier
- 2004 John E.* & Barbara Poole
- 2005 Roch Carrier
- 2006 Bluma Appel, O.C., O. Ont.*
- 2007 Joe Fafard
- 2008 Allan King, O.C.*
- 2009 Françoise Sullivan, O.C.
- 2010 Joyce Zemans, C.M.

== List of recipients of the Keith Kelly Award for Cultural Leadership ==
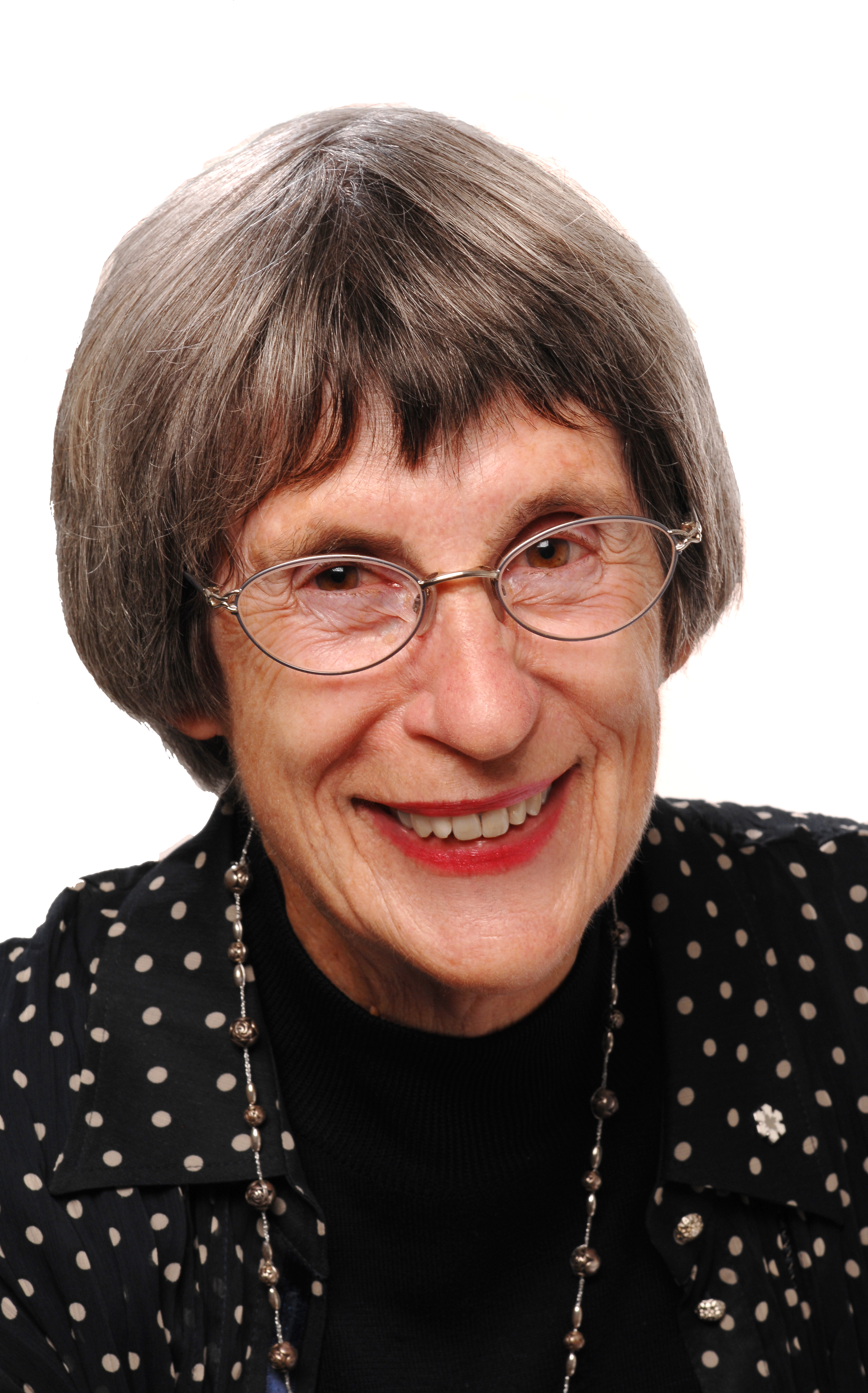
Nini Baird

- 1998 Keith Kelly
- 1999 Paul Siren, C.M.*
- 2000 Gilles Lefebvre, O.C.*
- 2001 Élise Paré-Tousignant
- 2002 John Kim Bell, O.C.
- 2003 Donald Sobey
- 2004 Mallory Gilbert
- 2005 Nini Baird, C.M.
- 2006 Pat Durr
- 2007 Garry Neil; Robert Pilon
- 2008 Simon Brault, O.C.
- 2009 Robert Jekyll
- 2010 Maurice Forget, C.M.

(*)=deceased

== CCA National Directors ==
- Alan Jarvis (1960–66)
- Herman Voaden (1966-1968)
- Henry Comor (1968)
- Duncan Cameron (1968-1971)
- John Hobday (1971-1982)
- Jeffery Holmes (1982-1983)
- Brian Anthony (1983-1986)
- Michelle d'Auray (1986-1989)
- Keith Kelly (1990-1999)
- Megan Williams (1999-2005)
- Jean Malavoy (2005)
- Alain Pineau (2005-2012)

== CAC/CCA Presidents ==
- Herman Voaden (1945-1948)
- A.H. Gillson (1948)
- Jean Bruchési (1949-1952)
- Claude Lewis (1952-1953)
- Roland Charlebois (1954-1955)
- John Parkin (1956-1957)
- Jean Bruchési (1957-1958)
- Robert Elie (1959)
- Arthur Gelber (1959-1968)
- Jean-Louis Roux (1968-1970)
- Gilles Lefebvre (1970-1972)
- Pauline McGibbon (1972-1974)
- Richard Courtney (1974-1976)
- Elizabeth Lane (1976-1978)
- Micheline Legendre (1978-1979)
- Lister Sinclair (1980-1983)
- Micheline Tessier (1983-1984)
- Curtis Barlow (1984-1986)
- Claudette Fortier (1986-1988)
- Paul Siren (1988-1990)
- Patrick Close (1990-1992)
- Simon Auger (1992-1994)
- Jan Miller (1994-1996)
- Mireille Gagne (1996-1998)
- Pat Bradley (1998-2001)
- Pierre Filion (2001-2002)
- Denise Roy (2002-2005)
- Robert Spickler (2005-2008)
- Kathleen Sharpe (2008-2012)
