= Ruth Carse =

Canadian dancer, educator and choreographer

- Born: Margaret Ruth Pringle Carse; 7 December 1916; Edmonton, Alberta
- Died: 14 November 1999 (aged 82); Ponoka, Alberta
- Occupations: Ballerina, ballet teacher
- Known for: Founder of Alberta Ballet Company

Margaret Ruth Pringle Carse (7 December 1916 – 14 November 1999) was a Canadian dancer, educator and choreographer. She founded the Alberta Ballet Company dance company and is a pioneer in the field of dance in western Canada.

She was born in Edmonton, Alberta, and trained in Scottish dancing as a child. She went on to study ballet. She performed with Boris Volkoff's company, with the National Ballet of Canada and with the ballet corps of Radio City Music Hall in New York City. After suffering an injury, she retired from dancing in 1954 and trained as a teacher with Gweneth Lloyd.

Carse returned to Edmonton, where she taught dance and developed choreography for operas and musical theatre there. With Muriel Taylor, she established a small amateur performing company called Dance Interlude, which was renamed the Edmonton Ballet in 1960 and the Alberta Ballet in 1971. Also in 1971, she established the Alberta Ballet School. She retired as artistic director for the company in 1975, but continued her association with the Alberta Ballet until 1983.

Ruth Carse was principal of, and a teacher at, the Alberta Ballet Company’s associated school in Edmonton AB, and was a generous mentor to the young students she saw potential in, students who could have a future as a company dancer, or prima ballerina. She created scholarships for these students; arranged for them to audition with the National Ballet Company school’s professional program; and gave them opportunities, as young students, to dance with the Alberta Ballet Company, in live performances at Alberta’s Ballet’s home theatre, the Jubilee Auditorium.

As a mentor who worked hard, she made sure her students had all of the tools they needed to have a bright future—even if it meant they continued their training with the National Ballet Company’s school instead. She remained principal until her retirement in 1983.

Even after she stepped down as artistic director of the company, she continued to develop choreography for operas, musical theatre, television productions and ballets.

In 1992, she was named to the Order of Canada.

Carse died in Ponoka at the age of 82.

In 2016, Ballet Edmonton's dance facility was renamed the Ruth Carse Centre for Dance in her honour. Carse Lane in Edmonton also named in her honour.
