= Toumine =

Toumine may refer to:

- Toumine, alternate spelling for Tumin, a village in Syria
- Nesta Toumine (1912–1996), Canadian dancer, choreographer, artistic director and teacher

== See also ==
- Tumin (disambiguation)
