= David Lee Moroni =

Canadian dancer and teacher

- Born: 14 March 1938 (age 88); Ottawa, Ontario, Canada
- Education: University of Winnipeg
- Occupations: Dancer; teacher

David Lee Moroni (born 14 March 1938) is a Canadian former dancer and teacher.

Moroni was born in Ottawa, Ontario, Canada. He studied dance at the Classical Ballet Company with Nesta Toumine and performed with her local company where he also taught. He also taught at the Lindenlea Municipal Ballet. In 1964, he joined the Royal Winnipeg Ballet, was promoted to soloist in 1966, and became principal dancer in 1967. In 1970, he joined the staff at the Royal Winnipeg Ballet School where he helped to establish the Professional Division program and became its principal. He also served as Associate Artistic Director of the Royal Winnipeg Ballet from 1976 to 1988. He retired in 2003. Moroni received the Order of Canada in 1990 and received an Honorary Doctor of Letters from the University of Winnipeg in 2014.

His students included:

- Evelyn Hart
- David Peregrine
- Tara Birtwhistle
- Jennifer Welsman

Moroni, who regularly performed the role of Drosselmeyer in the ballet company's production of The Nutcracker, appeared as Van Helsing in the film Dracula: Pages from a Virgin's Diary, based on a ballet by the Royal Winnipeg Ballet.

Moroni now lives in Fredericton, New Brunswick with his partner, Paul Daigle.
