= Francesco Ventriglia =

Italian dancer, choreographer and director

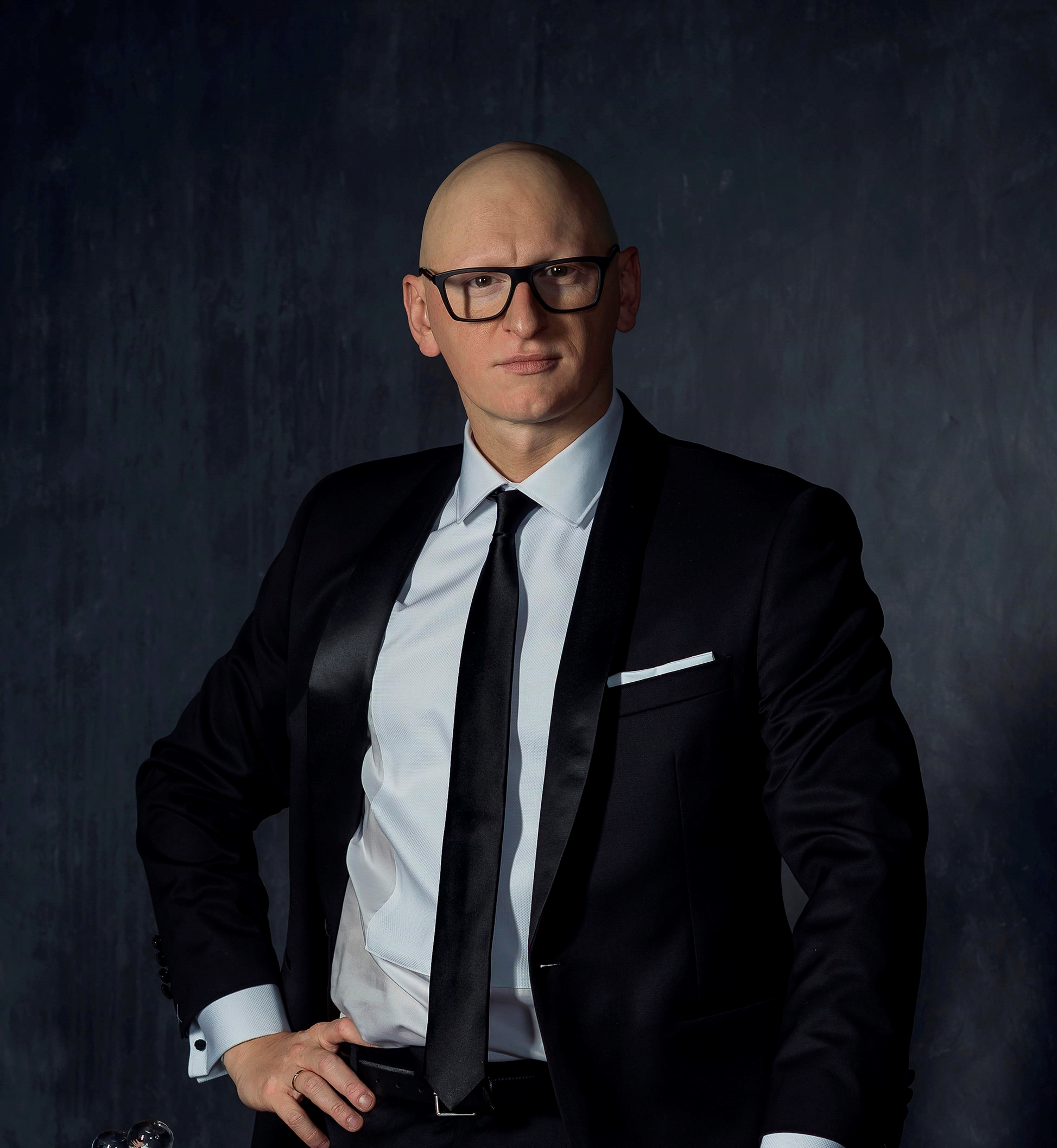
Francesco Ventriglia by Ross Brown, courtesy of the Royal New Zealand Ballet

Francesco Ventriglia (born 9 June 1978) is an Italian ballet dancer, choreographer and artistic director. He is currently the Artistic Director of Alberta Ballet. In 2010 he was appointed as Europe's youngest artistic director by the Florence Opera House at the age of 32, where he held the role as artistic director and principal choreographer for Maggio Danza until 2013. In 2014, he was named the artistic director of the Royal New Zealand Ballet until June 2017, and from January 2018, as adjunct artistic director of the National Ballet of Uruguay, Ballet Nacional Sodre alongside Igor Yebra. Ventriglia is also a choreographer of classical and contemporary ballet, having works performed internationally by companies such as the La Scala Ballet, Arena di Verona, Bolshoi Theatre, the Mariinsky Ballet, Grande Theatre du Geneve, Royal New Zealand Ballet, Ballet Nacional Sodre and at the Venice Biannale.

== Early life ==
Ventriglia was born in Battipaglia, Campania Italy on 9 June 1978. He began his ballet studies at the age of 7. Having gained entry to the La Scala Ballet School, he moved to Milano to undertake full time studies.

== Career ==
Ventriglia joined the ballet company of La Scala in 1997, making his debut as a soloist in William Forsythe's In The Middle, Somewhat Elevated at La Scala in 1998, and in 1999 was cast as the Bronze Idol by Natalia Makarova in her production of La Bayadère.

He danced numerous soloist roles with the company, including that of the Toreador in Roland Petit's Carmen and Quasimodo in Notre Dame de Paris and also works by Petipa, Natalia Makarova, Rudolf Nureyev, George Balanchine, Ailey, Neumeier, Cranko, Preljocaj, Godani, Kylián and Béjart. Internationally, his performances with La Scala included Hilarion at the Metropolitan Opera in New York and at Covent Garden, opposite Sylvie Guillem in her creation of Giselle.

Ventriglia began his choreographic career whilst a dancer at La Scala, having created a diverse repertoire for the Ballet School of La Scala, his own company, Heliopolis and other freelance works. For Roberto Bolle, he created The Fight (Curia of the Roman Senate in the Imperial Forum); New Year's Concert (La Fenice, Venice, later televised); and The Myth of the Phoenix (Teatro Smeraldo, Milan).

The Heliopolis Company made its debut at the Venice Biennale in 2007, with a new piece "The Sea in Chains", an investigation of eroticism and physical disability with the original music of Emiliano Palmieri, which was nominated for the Golden Lion. The following year he created a new work "Normale", which explored the concept of love and mental health: with these two titles Ventriglia curated a diptych as an investigation of differences present in modern society. Also in 2007, he created A Midsummer Night's Dream and Jago, the honest poetry of deception, for the Arena di Verona, with étoile of the Opéra National de Paris, Eleonora Abbagnato and Alessandro Riga. His pas de deux, Black has been performed at the Bolshoi Theatre by Svetlana Zakharova and Andrei Merkuriev (2008) and in New York by Irina Dvororenko and Maxim Beloserkovsky. In 2008 for the Mariinsky Theatre in St Petersburg he created Contradictions for Ulyana Lopatkina. In 2009 he created a new work specifically for Svetlana Zakharova titled Super Game which is a multimedia collaboration for the prima ballerina and six principal dancers of the Bolshoi Ballet. Additionally, his works included Immemoria, a work for 40 dancers to music by Shostakovich, premiering at La Scala in May 2010, and Sed lux permanent – Transit umbra, to music by Schoenberg, for the Ballet du Grand Théâtre de Genève.

Between 2007 and 2012, Ventriglia and Emiliano Palmieri collaborated on four creations: The Sea in Chains, Normale, Pinocchio and Willy Wonka and Chocolate Factory.

In 2010 Teatro alla Scala di Mlano, under the direction of Makar Vaziev, commissioned a new ballet by Ventriglia, on the first and the second movements of Symphony #7 Leningrad by Dimitri Shostakovic, "Immemoria". Immemoria was performed as part of a triptych alongside two masterpieces by George Balanchine, "Balletto Imperiale", and "The Prodigal Son". "Immemoria" won the Bucchi Award for the best performance of the year in 2010 [citation below].

In October 2010 Ventriglia was appointed director of MaggioDanza in Florence, Italy. His tenure was considered by the critics as a model example of "virtuous directorship" by "Il sole 24 ore", and in 2012 was awarded "Best Director of the Year" by Danza e Danza magazine. Hallmarks of his success included significant increases of activities for education; special programs for children, and alongside the classical repertoire, attracting to Florence works by leading choreographers such as George Balanchine, Jiri Kylian, Angelin Preljocaj, Susanna Linke, William Forsythe and new works by Andonis Foniadakis, invited guest artists such a Sylvie Guillem, and established a new platform to support young choreographers called "Short Time" that showcased to critics and public over 20 new works in 2 years.

In 2014, for Anna Antonickeva and Andrey Merkuriev (Principals of the Bolshoi Theatre) he created the evening "Fortuna vis Lucem: Bolero and Carmina Burana", performed with the New Ballet Theatre of Moscow, in tour across Russia and Cannes.

Ventriglia was appointed as the Royal New Zealand Ballet's artistic director in November 2014

In 2015 Ventriglia led the Royal New Zealand Ballet on an international tour (the UK and Italy). Additionally, he increased the repertoire of the company, introducing never before performed choreographers to New Zealand audiences such as Andonis Foniadakis, Alexander Ekman and Roland Petit

In 2016 he created a newly staged, longer version of his work "Wizard of Oz", touring across New Zealand. Originally devised for MaggioDanza, it was never performed after the theatre was closed on opening night due to building structural issues. The restaged production, designed by Gianluca Falaschi, toured New Zealand and was seen by over 38,000 people in its first season. Well received by audiences and critics alike, the production is regarded as one of the most successful productions created for the Royal New Zealand Ballet, breaking all box office records for the year.

Regularly interviewed internationally in both print and radio media as an advocate for ballet and Italian Dance, Francesco Ventriglia was invited to be a judge of The Genée International Ballet Competition 2016, alongside other judges David McAllister of the Australian Ballet and Kevin O'Hare of the Royal Ballet.

Ventriglia's tenure as artistic director of the Royal New Zealand Ballet concluded in June 2017, however he continued his relationship with the company, creating a new full length ballet, Romeo and Juliet which toured nationally. Designed by Academy Award winner James Acheson, the production was both a critical and box office success. Reviewed as his "Love letter to New Zealand", the production was hailed as a "splendid and triumphant" production.

From January 2018 until December 2020 Francesco was Adjunct Artistic Director of the National Ballet of Uruguay, alongside Artistic Director Igor Yebra. Igor Yebra.

In 2020 Francesco established himself in Sydney and co-founded the Sydney Choreographic Centre with Neil Christopher. Sydney Choreographic Ensemble was the resident performing group of the Centre, and made its debut with the world premiere of GRIMM at Parramatta Riverside Theatres.

In 2022-23, Francesco was Artistic Director and choreographer for the ballet A Thousand Tales, produced by the SAMIT Event Group, and performed at the Dubai Opera in January 2023.

As of January 2024, Francesco is the Artistic Director of Alberta Ballet, Canada.

== Choreographic works ==
Year	Title	Location / Theatre	Notes
2004	The Giant Alone	Milano	Independent Choreographic Production funded through an EU Arts Grant
2005	Mozart: Giallo '700, Genio, Furto e Follia	La Scala Ballet School	
2006	The Fight	Curia of the Roman Senate in the Imperial Forum	Created for Roberto Bolle
2006	New Years Concert	La Fenice, Venice	Created for Roberto Bolle, later televised
2006	Myth of the Phoenix	Teatro Smeraldo, Milan	Created for Roberto Bolle
2007	The Sea in Chains	La Biennale di Venezia, Venice	Nominated for a Golden Lion. Original score by Emiliano Palmieri
2008	Normale	Festival PSA Trento	Original score by Emiliano Palmieri
2008	Black	Bolshoi Theatre, Moscow	Created for Svetlana Zakarova and Andrey Merkuriev
2008	Midsummer Night's Dream	Arena di Verona	One Act Ballet
2009	Zakarova Supergame	Bolshoi Theatre, Moscow	Created for Svetlana Zakarova plus 6 principal dancers of the Bolshoi Theatre
2009	Contradiction	Mariinsky Theatre, St. Petersberg	Created for Ulyana Lopatkina
2009	Stabat Mater	Teatro Cantero Chiavari, Genova	Created for soloist dancers Teatro alla Scala
2010	Black	New York	Re-staged for Irina Dvorovenko and Maxim Bieloserkovsky principal dancers of the American Ballet Theatre
2010	Immemoria	Teatro alla Scala, Milan	7th Symphony by Shostakovich
2010	Transit Umbra: Transfigured Night	Grande Theatre du Geneve	Music by Arnold Shoenberg
2011	Pinocchio	Florence Opera House and Theatre Communal di Bologna	Family show. Original score by Emiliano Palmieri
2011	Choreographic project for Russian Television	Televised	With principal dancers of the Bolshoi Theatre; Moscow
2012	Midsummer Night's Dream	Florence Opera House and Theatre Communal di Bologna	Extended 2 Act Ballet
2012	Willy Wonka and Chocolate Factory	Florence Opera House	Family show. Original score by Emiliano Palmieri
2012	Genesis Tribute	Florence Opera House	Original music, Genesis
2013	Requiem	Reggio Emilia	Score by Gabriel Faure
2014	Fortuna vis Lucem: Bolero Carmina Burana	New Ballet Theatre, Moscow	With principal dancers of the Bolshoi Theatre Andrey Merkuriev and Anna Antonicheva
2016	Wizard of Oz	St. James Theatre, Wellington	Royal New Zealand Ballet. National tour of New Zealand, 38,000 tickets sold for 23 performances with record box office 2016
2017	Champagne Supernova	Music Video, Warner Music	Theia
2017	Romeo and Juliet	St. James Theatre, Wellington	Royal New Zealand Ballet. Set and costumes by 3 time Academy Award winner James Acheson, Dramaturgy Mario Mattia Giorgetti and Francesco Ventriglia
2018	Ravel Project: Bolero	Teatro Carcano, Milano	Jas Art Ballet

== Awards ==
- Gino Tani Award for the Arts (2005)
- Premio Positano Leonide Massine (2006)
- Bucchi Award for the best performance of the year, for Immemoria (2010)
- Danza e Danza Magazine, "Best Director of the Year" (2012) in recognition of his work at MaggioDanza. Refer to the PDF link to 2012 archive
