= Love Lies Bleeding =

Love Lies Bleeding may refer to:

== Plant ==
- Love-lies-bleeding (plant) (a.k.a. Amaranthus caudatus), an annual flowering plant

== Film and television ==
- Love Lies Bleeding (1993 film), a British television film by Ronan Bennett in the anthology series ScreenPlay
- Love Lies Bleeding, a 1993 BBC Northern Ireland film directed by Michael Winterbottom
- Love Lies Bleeding (1999 film), an Australian–American film with Faye Dunaway
- Love Lies Bleeding (2008 film), an American film with Christian Slater
- Love Lies Bleeding (2024 film), an American romantic thriller with Kristen Stewart
- Love Lies Bleeding (TV series), a 2006 British thriller crime drama that aired on ITV
- "Love Lies Bleeding" (Doctors), a 2004 television episode

== Music ==
- "Funeral for a Friend/Love Lies Bleeding", a 1973 song by Elton John from his album, Goodbye Yellow Brick Road
- A lyric in the chorus of the hit song "Hemorrhage (In My Hands)" by Fuel, from their 2000 album Something Like Human
- "Love Lies Bleeding", a song by the Thompson Twins on their 1983 album, Quick Step & Side Kick
- "Love Lies Bleeding" (Sonic Animation song), a 1999 song from aforementioned Australian band, off their album Orchid for the Afterworld
- "Love Lies Bleeding", a song by Basia from her 2009 album It's That Girl Again
- Love Lies Bleeding, a 1999 album by Michael Aston's Gene Loves Jezebel

== Written works ==
- "Love Lies Bleeding", an 1842 poem by William Wordsworth
- "Love Lies Bleeding", an 1883 poem by Algernon Charles Swinburne
- "Love Lies Bleeding", a story by John Patrick; basis for the 1946 film The Strange Love of Martha Ivers
- Love Lies Bleeding (novel), a 1948 detective novel by Edmund Crispin

== Theatre ==
- Philaster (play) or Love Lies a-Bleeding, a 1620 stage play by Francis Beaumont
- Love Lies Bleeding (ballet), a 2010 ballet choreographed by the Alberta Ballet Company
- Love-Lies-Bleeding (play), a 2005 play by Don DeLillo
