= David Peregrine =

Canadian actor and ballerina

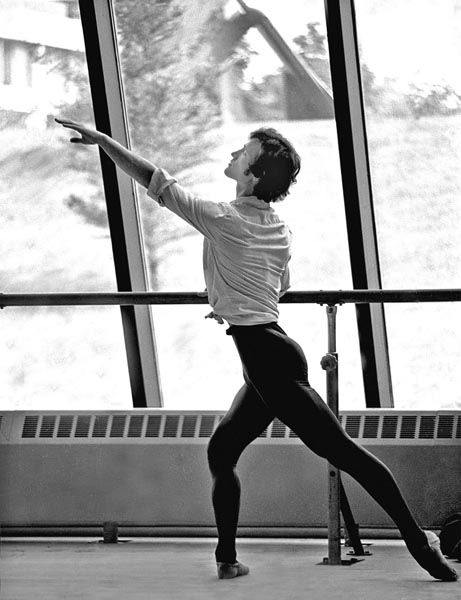

David Peregrine, OC (September 19, 1954 – c. June 7, 1989) was a Canadian dancer and actor.

== Life ==
He was born David Alan Evans in Llay, Wales and grew up in Ottawa. Peregrine studied ballet with Nesta Toumine in Ottawa, going on to study at the Royal Winnipeg Ballet school with David Moroni and at the Banff School of Fine Arts. Evans adopted the stage name David Peregrine. He joined the Royal Winnipeg Ballet as a member of the corps in 1975, becoming soloist three years later and principal dancer in 1980, partnering with Evelyn Hart. In 1980 he won a bronze medal at the International Ballet Competition in Varna, Bulgaria, performing the pas de deux from Norbert Vesak's ballet "Belong." Hart won a gold medal. In 1986, Peregrine was made an officer of the Order of Canada. He performed two seasons with the San Francisco Ballet and was a guest artist with the Alberta Ballet, Boston Ballet and Scottish Ballet. Peregrine appeared as Smike in the play Nicholas Nickleby and the monster in Frankenstein in productions by the Manitoba Theatre Centre.

He died in a plane crash on June 7, 1989 after flying his small plane 100 miles (160 km) south from Fairbanks, Alaska. Due to bad weather, a rescue crew was only able to reach the site 8 days later. Two passengers -- a friend and his brother (Meirig Evans of Ottawa, b.1970) -- also died in the crash.
