= Tumin (disambiguation) =

Tumin is a village in northwestern Syria. It may also refer to:

- Tumin an alternative currency in the Mexican municipality of El Espinal, Veracruz.

People

- Abul Kamal Tumin, military leader who conquered Fes in 1032.
- Melvin Tumin (1919 – 1994), American sociologist

== See also ==
- Nesta Toumine (1912 – 1996), Canadian dancer, choreographer, artistic director and teacher
- Stephen Tumim, British judge
- Aloizs Tumiņš (1938 – 2009), Latvian boxer from the Soviet Union
- Tumins, alternate name for Tamins
