= David Adams (dancer) =

Canadian ballet dancer

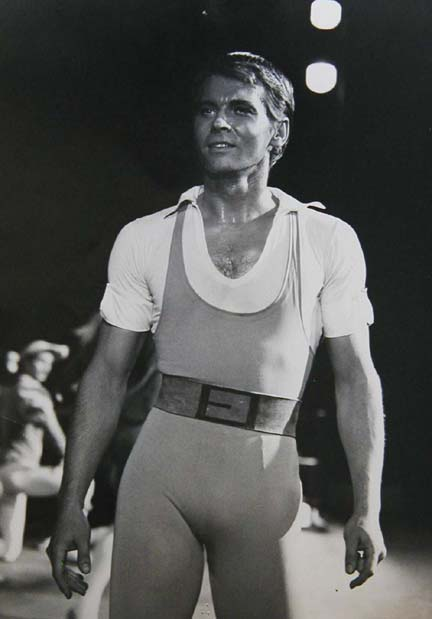
- David Adams as Peer Gynt
- Born: 16 November 1928; Winnipeg, Manitoba, Canada
- Died: 24 October 2007 (aged 78); Stony Plain, Alberta, Canada

David Adams (16 November 1928 – 24 October 2007) was a Canadian ballet dancer and a founding member of the National Ballet of Canada.

== Early career ==
After his training under Gweneth Lloyd at the Royal Winnipeg Ballet, David began his performing career with England's Metropolitan Ballet. Here he met Celia Franca, who would become the founding Artistic Director of the National Ballet of Canada. He also shared the stage with Eric Bruhn, Sonia Arova and John Taras, performing Design with Strings, Dances from Galanta and other works on a tour of Scandinavia.

== Career ==
He returned to Canada in 1949 and after a brief musical theatre diversion in Vancouver and California, moved to Toronto to join Celia Franca during the formative years of Canada's National Ballet. He became the company's first principal male dancer in 1951 and remained with the company until 1963. He used his knowledge of classical dance and stagecraft to build an audience for the company, and introduced Canada's first home-grown principal ballerina, his wife, Lois Smith. A brilliant amateur cinematographer, his "in-camera" videos from the 1950s are a significant part of the Celia Franca Tour De Force double DVD set. Adams also played a part in the birth of television in his native country, directing and performing in weekly productions for the fledgling Canadian Broadcasting Corporation (CBC).

In 1961, David moved to England, dancing with the London Festival Ballet (1961–69) and Royal Ballet (1970–1976). During his time with Festival Ballet, he became known in Europe as "Peer Gynt" because of the familiarity of ballet audiences with his appearance in that role. He danced with Margot Fonteyn, Galina Samsova, Toni Lander, Lynn Seymour, Svetlana Beriosova and others during a long and distinctive career which took him to the Middle East, South America and Japan.

David's contributions to "the art" include a body of choreography. Two of his own works, Suite in G and Walpurgisnacht, became part of the repertoire with Festival Ballet. Pas de deux Romantique (1961), Barbara Allen (1961), Pas de Six (1960), The Littlest One (1959), Pas de Chance (1956), Ballet Behind Us (1952) and Masquerade pas de deux (1951) are part of his contributions to the National Ballet of Canada.

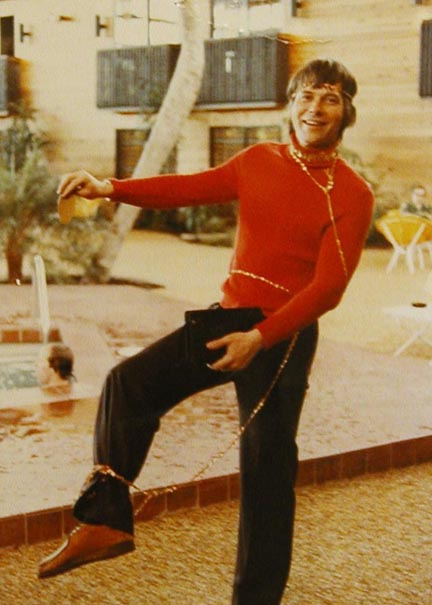
Lecture Demonstrations with the Alberta Ballet

In 1977, David relocated to Edmonton, Alberta, where he turned his talents to choreography and teaching and the occasional performance. He joined the Alberta Ballet Company under Brydon Paige, alternating between the roles of choreographer, ballet master, technical director and principal dancer. In 1980, David played a key role in the creation of both the dance and theatre programmes at Grant MacEwan College. His 1994 version of Don Quixote is unique in its presentation of Quixote's perspective, paralleling a psycho-drama to the dance story.

Adams also worked to preserve Canadian choreography. In 1983 he worked with Lawrence Adams and Miriam Adams, his brother and sister-in-law, to reconstruct and archive Boris Volkoff's Red Ears of Corn.

Adams retired from active teaching in 1998 and began work on a range of historic, artistic and technical memoirs.

== Awards ==
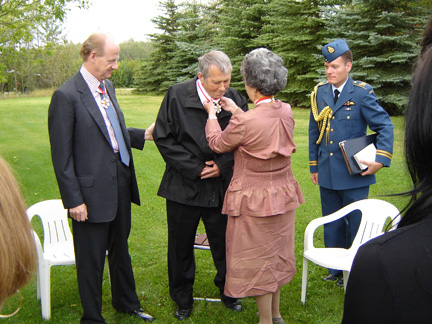
Adrienne Clarkson invests David Adams into the Order of Canada

In 1966 Adams won the Festival de la Opera Gold Medal in Madrid for his performance in Giselle.

In 2004, he was made an Officer of the Order of Canada. On 2 September 2005, Governor General Adrienne Clarkson presented him with the insignia of Officer of the Order of Canada during a private ceremony held near Stony Plain, Alberta.
