= Herman Voaden =

Canadian playwright (1903–1991)

Herman Arthur Voaden
- Born: January 19, 1903; London, Ontario, Canada
- Died: June 27, 1991 (aged 88); Toronto, Ontario, Canada
- Writing career
- Genre: Playwright
- Notable awards: Order of Canada

Herman Arthur Voaden, CM FRSA (19 January 1903 – 27 June 1991) was a Canadian playwright.

== Life and work ==
Born in London, Ontario, he received a Bachelor of Arts (Honours) degree in 1923 and a Master of Arts degree in 1926 from Queen's University. He also studied at the University of Chicago and at Yale University.

His father, Dr. Arthur Voaden, pioneered vocational teaching in Ontario. His mother, Luisa Bale Voaden, was also a teacher. Voaden studied modern drama at Queen's University, 1920–1923, and wrote his 1926 Queen’s M.A. thesis on Eugene O’Neill.

In 1928 Voaden became head of the English department at the Central High School of Commerce (now the Central Toronto Academy), where he worked for decades. In 1960 his work there was described as "pioneer[ing] in progressive education methods, including the 'play approach' to drama.'"

A member of the Co-operative Commonwealth Federation, he ran for the House of Commons of Canada in the western Toronto riding of Trinity in the 1945 elections, 1949 elections, 1953 elections, and a 1954 by-election. He lost each time.

Voaden was a member of Toronto's Arts and Letters Club, the Dominion Drama Festival, and a founding member and first president of the Canadian Arts Council (which became the Canadian Conference of the Arts in 1958). As president of the CAC, he was one of several Canadian representatives to the first UNESCO conference, held in Paris in 1946.

== Honours ==
In 1974, he was made a Member of the Order of Canada, Canada's highest civilian honor, "in recognition of his contribution to the performing arts as a playwright, producer and teacher, and his services in fostering support for all the arts and crafts". He was made a Fellow in the Royal Society of Arts in 1970.

Following his death, Queen's University created the Herman Voaden Playwriting Competition to honour new works by emerging playwrights.

== Works ==
- The White Kingdom (1928)
- Northern Storm (1929)
- Northern Song (1930)
- Western Wolf (1930)
- Fragment (1931)
- Wilderness (1931)
- Earth Song (1932)
- Rocks (1932)
- Hill-Land (1934)
- Murder Pattern (1936)
- Ascend As the Sun (1942)
- Libretto for the opera The Prodigal Son (music by Frederick Jacobi) (debuted 1945)
- Emily Carr: A Stage Biography with Pictures (first performed 1960)
