= Cameron Fraser-Monroe =

Canadian ballet choreographer

- Born: c. 1999 (age 26–27); Vernon, British Columbia, Canada
- Occupations: Dancer and choreographer
- Website: cameronfm.ca

Cameron Fraser-Monroe (born c. 1999) is a Canadian ballet choreographer and dancer. He has performed with the Royal Winnipeg Ballet and Atlantic Ballet Theatre of Canada, and currently serves as a choreographer for the Royal Winnipeg Ballet.

Fraser-Monroe was born circa 1999 and grew up in Vernon, British Columbia, a member of the Tla'amin Nation. He began dancing at age three, later studying Ukrainian dance, hooping, grass dance, and ballet. While attending high school in Kelowna, he auditioned for the Royal Winnipeg Ballet School "on a whim" and received a scholarship, graduating in 2017. Fraser-Moore has claimed he didn't particularly enjoy ballet, once stating that "ballet was like the broccoli you had to eat to get to the bacon".

After working with other companies, Fraser-Monroe joined the Atlantic Ballet Theatre of Canada in 2020, where he was the only First Nations ballet dancer performing with a professional company in Canada at the time.

Fraser-Moore has also trained at the Toronto Actors Studio.

Fraser-Monroe later switched to choreography, focusing primarily on ballet and working with companies including the National Ballet of Canada and the Royal Winnipeg Ballet. In 2022, Fraser-Monroe became the Royal Winnipeg Ballet's first Choreographer in Residence in 20 years. In 2024, the Royal Winnipeg Ballet premiered his full-length ballet, T’el: The Wild Man of the Woods, making him the first Indigenous person to choreograph a full-length ballet for a major company. Adapted from a story from his childhood, the work features Indigenous artists on the creative team and narration by Tla’amin knowledge keeper Elsie Paul in both English and Ayajuthem.
