= Love Lies Bleeding (ballet) =

2010 Canadian jukebox ballet

Love Lies Bleeding is a ballet performed by the Alberta Ballet Company that features the work of pop star Elton John. The ballet is a pop-contemporary jukebox ballet that features 14 songs written by John and his songwriting partner Bernie Taupin. The show was directed and choreographed by the company's artistic director Jean Grand-Maître. The show debuted at the Jubilee Auditorium in Calgary in May, 2010. The show was a critical and financial success and went on to perform around Canada and parts of the U.S.

== Background ==
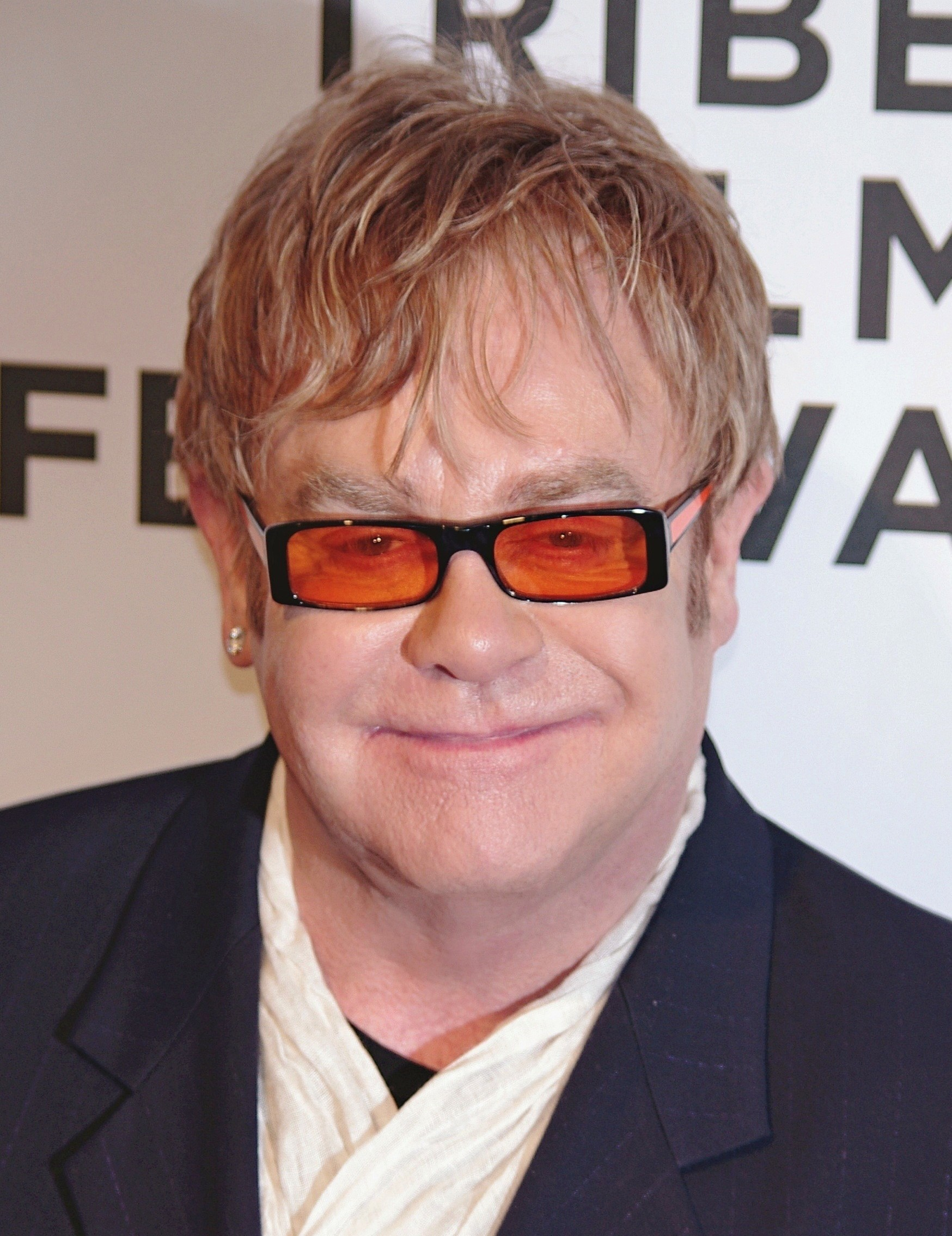
Elton John, the inspiration behind Love Lies Bleeding

Love Lies Bleeding was the second jukebox contemporary performed by the company. The first was a Joni Mitchell inspired ballet called The Fiddle and the Drum, which was also directed and choreographed by Grand-Maître. Mitchell had told a close friend of John about the ballet, to which John was interested. When John was on tour performing in Calgary, he arranged for Grand-Maître and some of the company's dancers to meet John before the show. Backstage, Grand-Maître gave John a DVD performance of The Fiddle and the Drum. Grand-Maître later emailed John's staff to see if John was interested in collaborating to create a ballet, to which John responded five minutes later asking Grand-Maître to fly out to Las Vegas to meet.

Grand-Maître met with John on February 14, 2009, at Caesar's Palace. Grand-Maître insisted he wanted to meet with John before creating any aspect of the ballet. Mitchell was very collaborative with Grand-Maître in the creation of The Fiddle and The Drum, so Grand-Maître did not prepare anything for his meeting with John. Grand-Maitre wanted to hear John's thoughts and intentions for the vision of the ballet before deciding the specifics about the production.

Grand-Maître said "[John] immediately started telling me about his life, about how many challenges he’s faced, how many hardships. He was addicted to alcohol. He was addicted to drugs. He was repressed as a homosexual. He wanted the ballet to talk about addiction, homosexual dignity, dignity for people living with HIV/AIDS". The ballet would be more centered around John's personal struggles, compared to Mitchell's ballet which was a more abstract portrayal of environmental issues. John also wanted the ballet "to draw new people to dance, people who’d never been to a theatre to see dance who would try it once".

Love Lies Bleeding became a 1.2 - 1.5 million dollar production, doubling its original budget estimate. The production featured 30 dancers and spawned another jukebox ballet collaboration with Sarah McLachlan titled Fumbling Towards Ecstasy.

== Story ==
Love Lies Bleeding is not a biographical story about John's life, but a production loosely inspired by John's struggles. The show's main character is Elton Fan, a representation of John as he goes through his struggles with fame, homosexuality, and drug use. Elton Fan is "the centerpiece of most of the production numbers". He is introduced in the beginning of the show wearing a sparkly baseball outfit that says "Elton and No.1 on the back". A representation of Elton does make an appearance as Young Elton, who appears on a tricycle to lead Elton Fan onto the stage.

The antagonists of the show are The Demonics. They are a group of dancers that appear throughout the show to lead Elton Fan to the dark elements of fame and homosexual prejudice. In their three numbers with Elton Fan they represent "pain and victimization in Have Mercy on the Criminal, the destroyers of beauty in Goodbye Yellow Brick Road, and the killers of dreams in The King Must Die". In I Need You To Turn To, one of the Demonics forces cocaine up Elton Fan's nose.

The show intentionally makes the gender of the dancers hard to determine. Drag queens are characters seen throughout the show and featured in Believe and The Bridge. The Bridge also features a duet between Elton Fan and another male dancer, ending the dance with a kiss.

Other characters that are specific to certain numbers include dancers dressed as baseball players, nuns, angels, and cowgirls.

Elton Fan stays on the stage the whole time, with most of his costume changes happening on stage. The show adds to its theatricality with use of large props and aerial choreography.

== Reception ==
Love Lies Bleeding was a critical and financial success for the company. Love Lies Bleeding commerciality and John's stardom made it the most successful out of the three jukebox musicals the company performed; it was the company's biggest box office success at the time of the company's 46-year run. Grand-Maître estimates that "8,000 and 10,000 people came to the ballet for the very first time in their lives [to see this] show". Its success also garnered a television special where the company performed the show on the CBC.

Critics were entertained by the show. They predicted the show's success, saying it would "make buckets for the company." Critics categorized Love Lies Bleeding as ballet-lite and wrote that the elements of jazz and musical theater in the choreography made it more accessible to a broad audience. They were impressed by the dancers, especially Yukichi Hattori, who played Elton Fan. Critics admired the costumes. Paula Citron of The Globe and Mail said that "the non-stop parade of razzle-dazzle costumes by Martine Bertrand rivals Las Vegas for sheer spectacle" and "Adam Larsen's eye-popping projections provide the showy backdrop for the dancing".

Criticism for the show included the performances needed to be fine tuned with repeated runs and the quick changes done on stage for Elton Fan needed more work. Paula Citron of The Globe and Mail also said that "it seemed the razzle-dazzle of the staging hid a multitude of flaws".

Gail Johnson from The Georgia Straight questioned if Grand-Maître was becoming predictable with his jukebox ballets. Grand-Maître replied that "[the Alberta Ballet Company] has done three pop ballets now, but they’re completely different from each other; they don’t even remotely resemble each other. If it’s formulaic to use pop music, then wouldn’t it be formulaic to use classical music all the time? It would become formulaic if the ballets resembled each other and followed the same recipe, but we’re avoiding that at all costs".

== Performances ==
Love Lies Bleeding debuted at the Jubilee Auditorium in Calgary in May 2010. Due to its success, Grand-Maître proposed a tour for the production. The tour would have to be approved by John. After watching a DVD of the performance, John approved a tour with two conditions.

The first condition was that "the ballet cannot be performed in a city where either the entertainer himself is performing, or where the two musicals The Lion King and Billy Elliot, both with music written by John, are running". The second condition was that the show can only be performed in venues that are well suited and known for hosting ballets. John referred to these as the "ballet fraternity". Grand-Maître explained that "if we go to London, we go to Sadler's Wells Theatre, or if we go to New York, we go to City Center...We don't want to pretend it's a Broadway show. [John] likes it because it's an innovative contemporary ballet. And he wants new people to come to the ballet".

Grand-Maître wanted the tour be primarily in Canada, making some stops in the U.S. The company performed in Toronto for a six night run from November 8–12, 2011, at the Sony Centre, again at the Jubilee Auditorium in Calgary from May 2–5, 2012, and at the Jubilee Auditorium in Edmonton from May 10–12, 2012. Love Lies Bleeding performed in the U.S. in Houston, Texas, at the Wortham Theater Center from January 30 - February 1, 2015, for the Houston Ballet's Cullen Series. Love Lies Bleeding later performed back in Calgary in the spring of 2016, and in Winnipeg at the Winnipeg's Centennial Concert Hall from March 1–5, 2017.

== Musical numbers ==
Act 1
Number	Song	Characters
Bennie: The Big Contract	Bennie and The Jets	Elton Fan, Baseball Corps
Teenage Idol: The Pace	I'm Going To Be A Teenage Idol	Elton Fan, The Cowgirls, The Clockworks
Honky: Pushing It	Honky Cat	Elton Fan, The Honkies, The Demonics
Goodbye Yellow: The Demonics - Take One	Goodbye Yellow Brick Road	Elton Fan, The Demonics
Rocketman: Take Off With Us	Rocket Man	Elton Fan, The Demonics
Madman: A Golden Dream	Madman Across the Water	Elton Fan, The Gladiators
Have Mercy: The Demonics - Take Two	Have Mercy on the Criminal	Elton Fan, The Demonics

Act 2
Number	Song	Characters
60 Years: The Insatiable Urge	Sixty Years On	Elton Fan, The Lovers
I Need You: The Show Can't Go On	I Need You To Turn To	Elton Fan, The Marie-Antoinettes, The Demonics, Cecile and Danceny
The King Must Die: The Demonics - Take Three	The King Must Die	Elton Fan, The Demonics
Someone Saved: Last Call	Someone Saved My Life Tonight	Elton Fan, The Angels
Believe: The Bone	Believe	Elton Fan, The Drags
The Bridge: The Plunge	The Bridge	Elton Fan, The Drags
Saturday Night's Alright: Back in Business	Saturday Night's Alright For Fighting	Full Company

Other songs by John and Taupin featured as excerpts in the show include: Belfast, Candle In The Wind, Funeral For A Friend/Love Lies Bleeding, Out Of The Blue, Skyline Pigeon, Song For Guy, and Your Song.

== Creative team ==
Creative Team for Love Lies Bleeding
Name	Role
Jean Grand-Maître	Director/Choreographer/Libretto
Adam Larsen	Projections/Video Effects
Pierre Lavoie	Lighting
Guillaume Lord	Set Design
Claude Lemelin	Sound
Martine Bertrand	Costumes
David Mirvish	Producer
Corey Ross	Producer
Adrian You	Flying Choreographer
Paul J. Toth	Broadcast Media Designer

As well as being the director, choreographer, and libretto writer for Love Lies Bleeding, the creation of the show marked Grand-Maître's 10th year as artistic director for the Alberta Ballet Company. Martine Bertrand designed "440 accessories, 60 custom designed wigs, and 150 elaborate costumes worn on set".
