= Dance Collection Danse =

Based in Toronto, Dance Collection Danse (DCD) is an archives, publisher and research centre dedicated to Canadian dance history. It was founded in 1983 by former National Ballet of Canada dancers Lawrence Adams and Miriam Adams. Long time DCD director of collections and research and writer Amy Bowring was appointed Executive and Curatorial Director in 2019.
