= True North: Symphonic Ballet =

True North: Symphonic Ballet is a pièce d'occasion commissioned by the Calgary Philharmonic Orchestra to celebrate Canada's 150th birthday.

The work was co-ordinated by composer and artistic director Vincent Ho, who brought together four more Canadian composers, Dinuk Wijeratne from Halifax, Montreal's Maxime McKinley, Dorothy Chang of Vancouver, and Derek Charke of Wolfville, along with pow-wow musician Hal Eagletail.

Each composer contributed a movement: Eagletail performed the prelude and postlude; the first movement was Wijeratne's "First Winter". McKinley created the second movement, which was followed by Charke's contribution, "Industrial". Chang composed the fourth movement, "Northern Star", and the fifth movement, by Ho, was titled "Earthbeat".

The dance was choreographed by Yukichi Hattori. The combined music and dance was premiered at the True North Festival in 2017, with Gary Kulesha conducting the Calgary Philharmonic.
