= Peter Dala =

Canadian conductor of opera and ballet

Peter Dala is a Canadian conductor of opera and ballet. He is a music director of the Alberta Ballet. He has conducted in Canada, the United States, Switzerland, England, Monte Carlo, Israel, Germany, Singapore, Hong Kong and China.

== Early life and education ==
Peter Dala was born in Toronto, Ontario. His parents immigrated to Canada after the 1956 Hungarian Revolution. He attended Saint Michael’s Choir School in Toronto. Peter Dala studied piano and conducting at England's Royal College of Music and worked at the Royal Ballet School as a pianist.

== Career in Europe ==
As conductor and pianist of the Basel Ballet, Peter Dala conducted Coppélia, La fille mal gardée, The Nutcracker, and Giselle. In 1987, he joined Zurich Opera’s International Operastudio. Peter Dala joined the Hungarian State Opera in Budapest in 1988 and the Hungarian Dance Academy in 1994 as Music Director.

In 1988, he joined the Hungarian State Opera in Budapest, where he conducted both opera and ballet Midsummer Night's Dream in the Singapore and Hong Kong Festival of Arts.

== Career in Canada ==
After six years in Budapest, Peter Dala joined Edmonton Opera as Chorus Director / Répétiteur. In June, 2002, Peter Dala was appointed resident conductor of the Edmonton Opera.

Peter Dala has been associated with the Alberta Ballet since 2001, when he conducted The Nutcracker. He became Alberta Ballet's Music Director in October 2005. In 2010, two productions of The Nutcracker in Vancouver were conducted by siblings. For Alberta Ballet, the conductor was Peter Dala; for Goh Ballet, the conductor was Leslie Dala, the associate conductor of the Vancouver Opera Orchestra.
