= Lois Smith (dancer) =

Canadian ballet dancer and dance teacher (1929–2011)

- Born: Lois Irene Smith; 8 October 1929; Vancouver, British Columbia, Canada
- Died: 22 January 2011 (aged 81); Sechelt, British Columbia, Canada
- Occupations: Prima ballerina, dance teacher
- Known for: First National Ballet of Canada prima ballerina
- Spouse: David Adams (m. 1950)
- Children: 1

Lois Irene Smith (8 October 1929 – 22 January 2011) was a Canadian ballet dancer and dance teacher who was the first prima ballerina of the National Ballet of Canada. After her retirement from the company in 1969, she founded her own dance school, the Lois Smith Dance School, which was eventually incorporated into the George Brown College, with Smith serving as the head of the college's dance department from 1979 to 1988. She also known for performing with her husband, David Adams, in ballets including Coppélia, Jardin aux lilas and Swan Lake, resulting in them being dubbed "Mr. and Mrs. Ballet" in the media.

== Early life and education ==
Lois Irene Smith was born in Burnaby, Vancouver on 8 October 1929. She was entered and won the Burnaby's Best Baby Contest at 11 months old. Despite a recommendation by a neighbour to try ballet, her family could not afford lessons. Smith's father instead taught her basic gymnastics. When her older brother Bill got a job at a shoe factory, he offered to pay for ballet lessons, leading to her acceptance at the British Columbia School of Ballet run by Dorothy Wilson at the age of 10. The lessons stopped however, when Bill lost his job at the factory. It was not until Smith was 15 that her family could afford to pay for lessons, this time with Rosemary Deveson. Deveson was shocked that Smith only had a year's ballet training and encouraged her to become a professional dancer. As a result, Smith decided to drop out of high school in order to focus on dance full-time, and demonstrated during lessons in order to pay for them. She also trained with Mara McBirney.

== Career ==
Smith was hired to perform summer musicals with the Theatre Under the Stars in Stanley Park when she was 17. She continued working for them for another 5 years despite Smith later recalling that the salary was almost non-existent.

She married fellow Canadian dancer David Adams (1928–2007) on 13 May 1950, a year after the pair first danced together. The pair danced together in American dance companies due to a lack of opportunities in Canada at the time, including in Oklahoma! and Song of Norway. The couple had one daughter, Janine, born in 1951.

In 1951, Adams was invited by Celia Franca, with whom he had previously worked with in London, to join her new national Canadian dance company, he recommended his wife to her. Despite Smith's lack of experience, Franca saw potential in her and a willingness to receive further training. As a result, the couple joined the National Ballet of Canada, with Smith serving as the company's initial prima ballerina, despite having only recently given birth and having to rely on her in-laws for childcare. The couple was pushed as the company's star dancers, dancing together in productions including Coppélia, Jardin aux lilas and Swan Lake. Due to their popularity, they were known as a ballet power couple, leading in them being dubbed "Mr. and Mrs. Ballet" in the media. However, the couple separated during the early 1960s, after Adams decided to move to Britain to further his career. She also co-founded the Dance Company of Ontario while working at the college. Smith was then partnered with Earl Kraul.

After eighteen years at the National Ballet, she left following a knee injury, to establish her own dance school in 1969, the Lois Smith Dance School. The school was later integrated into the George Brown College as its performing arts program, with Smith acting as chairman and leading the dance department from 1979 to 1988.

She was appointed an Officer of the Order of Canada on 23 June 1980 and invested in October 1980.

== Later life and death ==
In 1988, she retired from dance and moved to the Sunshine Coast in British Columbia. However, she continued to occasionally teach and choreograph.

Smith died in Sechelt, British Columbia on 22 January 2011, aged 81, after suffering from Alzheimer's disease. After her death, she bequeathed money and various items to the Dance Collection Danse, including several handmade dresses that she wore during her performances.
