= Evelyn Hart =

Canadian ballerina

Evelyn Anne Hart CC OM FRSC
- Born: April 4, 1956 (age 69); Toronto, Ontario
- Known for: Ballerina and former principal dancer with the Royal Winnipeg Ballet

Evelyn Anne Hart CC OM FRSC (born April 4, 1956) is a Canadian ballerina and former principal dancer with the Royal Winnipeg Ballet.

== Life and career ==
Born in Toronto, Ontario, Hart studied dance at the Dorothy Carter School of Dance in London, Ontario, Canada, and later at the Royal Winnipeg Ballet School. Before attending the Royal Winnipeg Ballet, Hart auditioned for The National Ballet School of Canada in Toronto, Ontario. She was accepted for its preliminary intensive summer session of auditioning for consideration as a student in the year's intensive academic/professional training program, where students train for its parent company the National Ballet of Canada. Hart did not secure a place for the school year at the National Ballet School, mostly due to her problems with anorexia nervosa. Hart battled with this pathological eating disorder before returning to ballet, training again, and winning a place for herself at The Royal Winnipeg Ballet School. She joined the Royal Winnipeg Ballet company in 1976, was promoted to soloist in 1978, and to principal dancer in 1979.

She was the first Canadian to win gold at the Varna International Ballet Competition in Varna, Bulgaria in 1980 for the pas de deux Belong choreographed by Norbert Vesak.

Hart starred in the ballet film Moment of Light, alongside Rex Harrington, former principal dancer of the National Ballet of Canada, and Robert Sher-Machherndl, former principal dancer of the Dutch National Ballet and Bavarian State Ballet. The film was released in 1992.

In 2005, Hart left the RWB to dance as a freelance artist. On August 23, 2006, she danced her swan song at the Grand Theatre in London, Ontario. She also danced as a guest artist with Toronto's ProArteDanza ending a thirty-year career.

== Honours ==
In 1983, Hart was made an Officer of the Order of Canada (OC) and was promoted to Companion (CC) in 1994. In 2000 she was inducted into Canada's Walk of Fame. In 2001, Hart received a Governor General's Performing Arts Award for Lifetime Artistic Achievement, Canada's highest honour in the performing arts. In 2006, she was made a Fellow of the Royal Society of Canada. She was made a Member of the Order of Manitoba (OM) in 2006.
