= Abul Kamal Tumin =

Moroccan rebel

Abul Kamal Tumin, a Zenata (?) rebel, conquered the Moroccan town of Fes in 1032, killing 6,000 Jews.

After 926, the Idrisids had abandoned Fes for good and withdrew to the valleys of the Rif mountains. And a turbulent time began until the establishment of the Almoravid dynasty in the 1060s. Under Ali az-Zahir, the seventh Fatimid Khalif, Bedouin revolts erupted.

== See also ==
- History of Morocco
- Zirid
- Al-Muizz ibn Badis
