= Yukichi Hattori =

Japanese-Canadian ballet dancer

Yukichi Hattori is a Japanese-Canadian ballet dancer, dance teacher and choreographer based in Calgary, Alberta. He is a former principal dancer with the Alberta Ballet Company.

== Early life ==
Hattori grew up in Tokyo, Japan; his parents were actors.

== Career ==
Hattori danced with the Hamburg Ballet in Germany, where he met dancer Galien Johnston; the two were married. They moved to Calgary, Alberta, in 2006, where they both danced with the Alberta Ballet Company, for which Hattori became principal dancer.

Hattori choreographed dances for the company, including Stravinsky’s "Le Sacre du Printemps", which premiered in early 2016.

Hattori retired from the ABC after the 2015-2016 season, during which he performed the role of Elton John in the glam-rock ballet Love Lies Bleeding; soon after, he and Johnson-Hattori opened a dance studio, the H/W Ballet School.

Hattori was commissioned by the Calgary Philharmonic Orchestra to choreograph a ballet to accompany a five-movement symphony honouring Canada's 150th birthday. The resulting work, True North: Symphonic Ballet, premiered at the True North Festival in Calgary in 2017.

In 2019 Hattori choreographed Billy Elliott: the Musical for Theatre Calgary.
