= Robert Sher-Machherndl =

Austrian ballet dancer and choreographer

Robert Sher-Machherndl is a Colorado-based choreographer and former principal dancer with the Dutch National Ballet and Bavarian State Ballet. He is the founder and currently the artistic director of Lemon Sponge Cake Contemporary Ballet in Boulder, CO.

Sher-Machherndl was born in Vienna, Austria. and relocated to the United States on an O-1 nonimmigrant visa (granted for aliens who possess extraordinary ability in the arts or other fields).

== Career and repertoire ==
Sher-Machherndl danced with the Dutch National Ballet and with the Bavarian State Ballet in the 1980s and 1990s. He relocated to the United States after his tenures with these companies and founded Lemon Sponge Cake Contemporary Ballet in Boulder, CO in 2003, under which he choreographs and performs in original works.

Additionally, Sher-Machherndl has created choreography for Finnish National Ballet, Vienna State Opera Ballet, Bavarian State Ballet, Scapino Ballet, Salzburg Ballet, Cleo Parker Robinson, Santa Fe Dance Festival, Lines Ballet BFA and Training Program, Ballet Next, University of Colorado, Colorado State University, University of Wyoming, Kuopio Dance Festival, Moving People Dance, American College Dance Festival, and Colorado Ballet Training Program.

=== Media recognition ===
Sher-Machherndl was named 2010 Dance Person of the Year by The Denver Post. In 2015, Denver Arts & Venues’ Public Art Program commissioned his piece "White Mirror" as their first-ever dance piece commissioned. In 2018, Dance Spirit named Lemon Sponge Cake Contemporary Ballet as one of their “10 Contemporary Ballet Companies You Should Be Obsessed With.”

=== Roles ===
Principal roles with Dutch National Ballet and Bavarian State Ballet

- Swan Lake
- Giselle
- Romeo and Juliet
- Onegin
- Cinderella
- Sleeping Beauty
- Nuages
- Apollo
- Stravinsky Violin Concerto
- Serenade
- Symphony in C
- Diamonds
- Concerto Barocco
- Agon
- La Valse
- Divertimento No. 15 (Mozart)
- Hammerklavier
- Grosse Fuge
- Bad Blood

Original Choreography under Lemon Sponge Cake Contemporary Ballet

- UnCut
- Point
- PlastikPaket
- StrangeLands
- LoveCrimes
- AustriaPop
- Where Is The Love
- AustriaPop Vol 2
- Vertigo
- Le Ballet Star
- TigerLilly
- Anilla
- Mozart 250
- Alien Nation
- Leopoldstadt 22
- Project Peace
- Gala 2007
- I Am Happy for this Moment
- This Moment Is Your Life
- I Trust You To Kill Me
- A Strange Land
- Liquid-Space
- White Mirror
- Vertical Migration
- Bach 260
- White Fields
- GONE
