= Royal Winnipeg Ballet =

Canadian ballet company

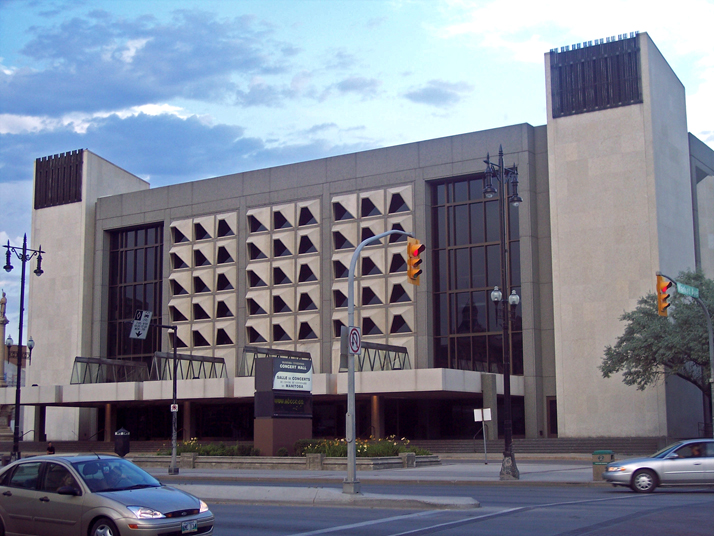
- Centennial Concert Hall, principal performance venue of the RWB

General information
- Name: Royal Winnipeg Ballet
- Previous names: Winnipeg Ballet; Winnipeg Ballet Club
- Year founded: 1939
- Founding choreographers: Gweneth Lloyd and Betty Farrally
- Location: 380 Graham Avenue; Winnipeg, Manitoba; R3C 4K2
- Principal venue: Centennial Concert Hall
- Website: www.rwb.org

Senior staff
- Executive director: Elena Tupyseva

Artistic staff
- Artistic director: Christopher Stowell
- Deputy director: Tara Birtwhistle
- Ballet masters: Jaime Vargas

Other
- Orchestra: Winnipeg Symphony Orchestra
- Official school: Royal Winnipeg Ballet School
- Formation: Principal; First Soloist; Second Soloist; Corps de Ballet; Apprentice; Aspirant

The Royal Winnipeg Ballet (RWB) is Canada's oldest ballet company and the longest continuously operating ballet company in North America.

== History ==
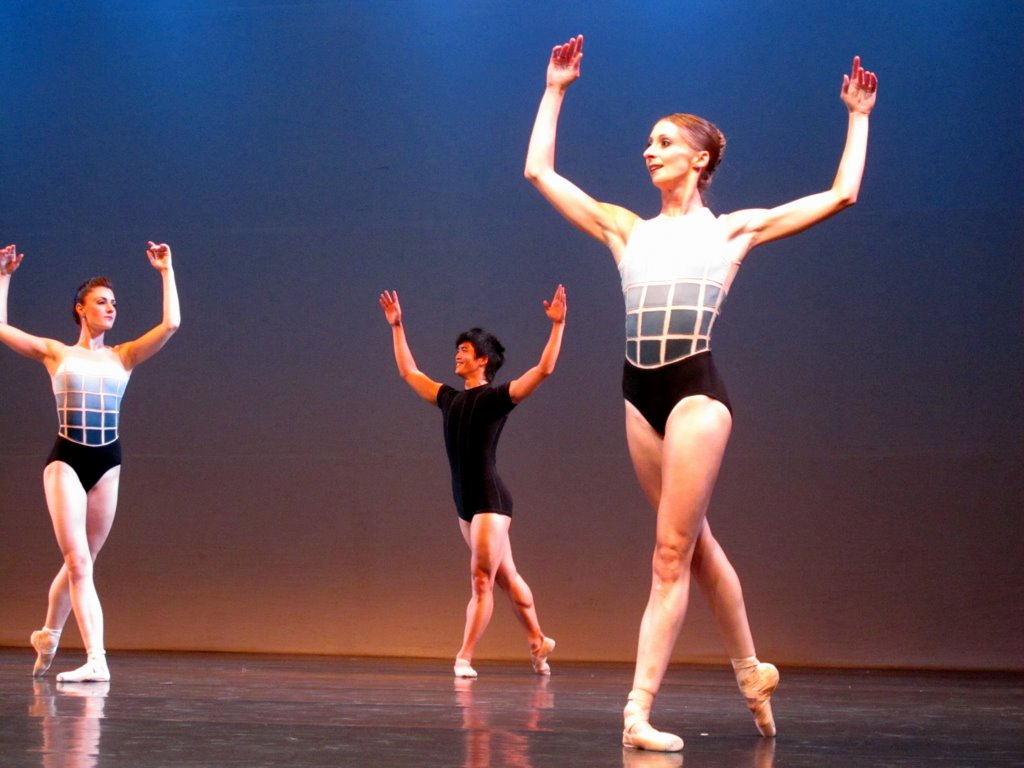
From left to right: Amanda Green, Yosuke Mino, and Vanessa Lawson

It was founded in 1939 as the "Winnipeg Ballet Club" by Gweneth Lloyd and Betty Farrally (who also founded the ballet school The Canadian School of Ballet in British Columbia). The name was changed to the "Winnipeg Ballet" in 1941 and the company began touring Canada in 1945. In 1948, with the initiative of the Winnipeg Ballet, the Canadian Ballet Festival was formed.

The Royal Winnipeg Ballet was granted its royal title in 1953, the first granted under the reign of Queen Elizabeth II. It completed its first American tour in 1954. In June that year the RWB's rented premises were devastated by fire; the company's entire stock of costumes, original music, choreographic scores and sets were destroyed. Conductor Eric Wild served as the company's music director from 1955 to 1962.

The company solidified its reputation under the artistic directorship of Saskatchewan-born Arnold Spohr from 1958 to 1988. Spohr, who first joined the company as a dancer in 1945, during his tenure maintained a strong focus on developing Canadian talent, and, at the same time, he developed the RWB as an international touring company, and actively engaged with choreographers and dancers from around the world to expand the ballet.

In 1974, famed Latvian dancer Mikhail Baryshnikov defected to Canada and joined the Royal Winnipeg Ballet, along with Gelsey Kirkland in fall of that year, desiring to begin his North American career outside the big city spotlight of New York. "It's not that we felt we could perform (in Winnipeg) without any risk," Baryshnikov said at the time. "There's risk whenever you perform. We had to start somewhere and we are happy that it was here." Baryshnikov and Kirkland danced the pas-de-deux from Don Quixote, drawing standing ovations from the Winnipeg audience.

Andre Lewis' decades-long association with the RWB began in 1975 when he was accepted into the Professional Division at the Royal Winnipeg Ballet School. In 1979, he was joined the Royal Winnipeg Ballet Company and performed as a dancer with the RWB until 1990. Lewis' roles include: Gunther in Nutcracker; Mercutio in Romeo and Juliet; and Jamie Paul in The Ecstasy of Rita Joe.

Evelyn Hart is the dancer most associated with the RWB. Born in Toronto, Ontario, in 1956, Hart made her professional debut with the RWB in 1976. In 1980, she was awarded the bronze medal at the World Ballet Concours in Japan, and the gold medal at the Varna International Ballet Competition where she also received the Exceptional Artistic Achievement Award. Both medals were awarded for her performance of Belong pas de deux, created by internationally acclaimed choreographer Norbert Vesak as part of his work What To Do Till the Messiah Comes. Hart was awarded the Order of Canada in 1983. She left the RWB in 2005. David Peregrine, Hart's long-time partner, joined the Royal Winnipeg Ballet as a member of the corps in 1975 and became a soloist three years later and principal dancer in 1980; that year the pair both performed in Varna. Peregrine was made an officer of the Order of Canada in 1986.

In 1981 the company participated alongside the National Ballet of Canada, Les Grands Ballets Canadiens, le Groupe de la Place Royale, the Danny Grossman Dance Company, the Toronto Dance Theatre, Winnipeg's Contemporary Dancers and the Anna Wyman Dance Theatre in the Canadian Dance Spectacular, a dance show at Ottawa's National Arts Centre which was filmed by the National Film Board of Canada for the 1982 documentary film Gala. Principal dancer Laura Graham was awarded a Silver medal at the 14th Varna International Ballet Competition in 1990. Her team included principal Steven Hyde, receiving a best non-competing partner honor, and soloist Mark Godden receiving best new choreography for 'Myth'. Principal dancer Suzanne Rubio followed in 1991 winning a Bronze medal at the 2nd Helsinki International Ballet Competition.

Spohr was succeeded by RWB principal dancer Henny Jurriëns who was formerly assistant to Dutch National Ballet director Rudi van Dantzig. Jurriëns, however, died in a car accident in April 1989. In 1990 John Meehan from American Ballet Theatre became artistic director but left in 1993 following the company's persistent financial difficulties. William Whitener, formerly the artistic director of Les Ballets Jazz de Montréal, was chosen to succeed Meehan. Continuing financial problems and dancer "unrest", Whitener was released in less than two years later.

In 1992, Gweneth Lloyd, co-founder of the company, became the first recipient of the Governor General's Performing Arts Award for Lifetime Artistic Achievement. André Lewis was appointed in 1996 as artistic director.

In 2012, the Royal Winnipeg Ballet, together with the Atlanta Ballet co-commissioned and performed Twyla Tharp's full-length ballet The Princess and the Goblin, based on George MacDonald's story The Princess and the Goblin, her first ballet to include children.

The company spends 20 or more weeks a year on the road, presenting more than 100 performances every year in both large and small centres. The company also mounts four productions a year in Winnipeg's performing arts venue, the Centennial Concert Hall.

== Royal Winnipeg Ballet School ==
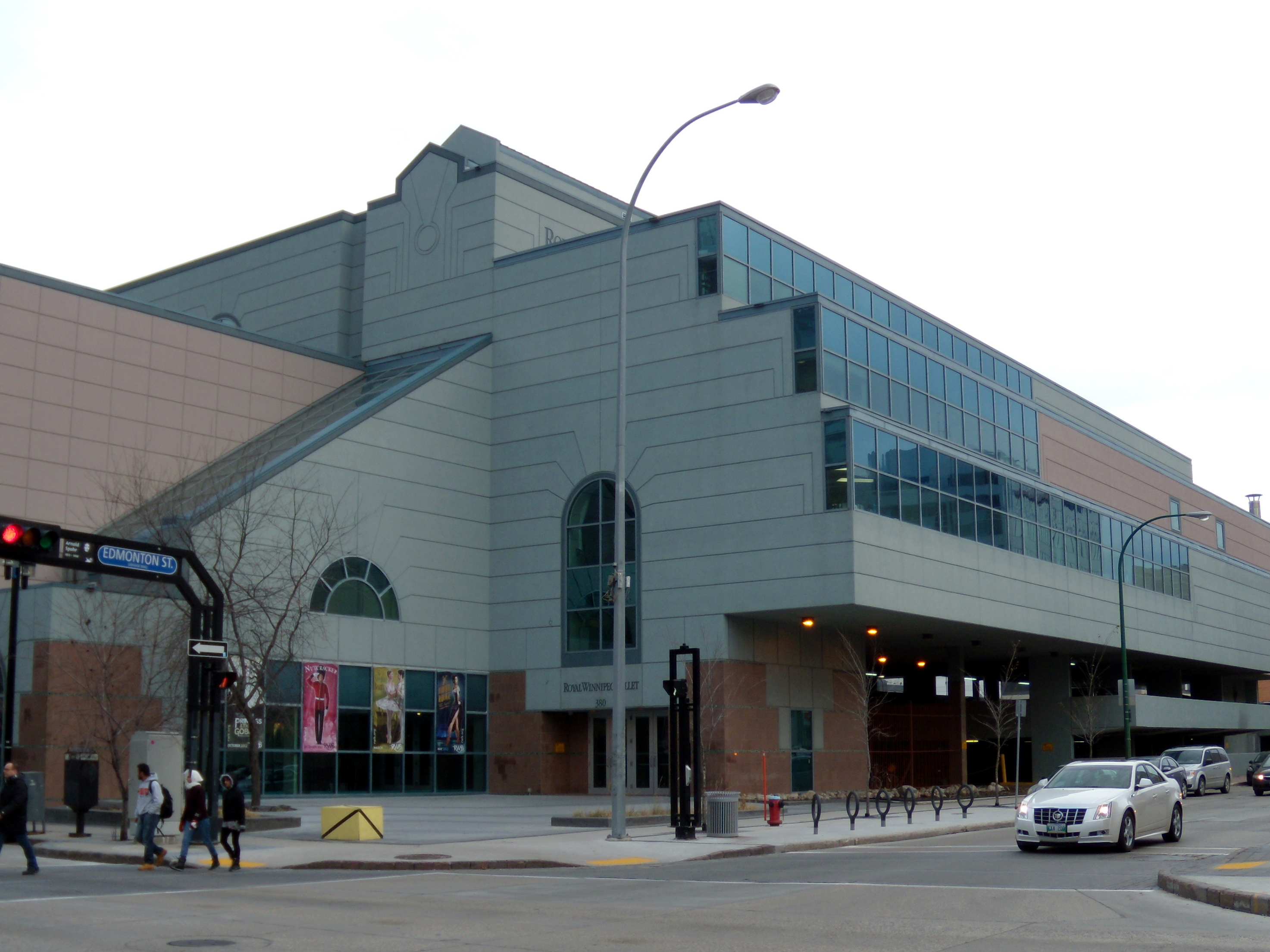
Royal Winnipeg Ballet building, 380 Graham Avenue

The Royal Winnipeg Ballet School is composed of two divisions, Recreational and Professional, and is home to the more than 1,500 students annually. The current building opened in January 1988, and features 12 spacious, sprung-floor studios, and a 224-seat performance space.

The Royal Winnipeg Ballet School, Recreational Division provides training and instruction to students age 3+ in various disciplines including Ballet, Tap, Jazz, Lyrical/Contemporary, Pointe, Musical Theatre, Modern, Creative Movement and Hip Hop. The Recreational Division features an audition-only competitive Dance Ensemble program for high level Junior to Senior students. The school also offers an Intensive Training Program for students who have shown ability and dedication for more intense, specialized training in classical ballet. In this program, numerous ballet classes are supported with additional classes such as pointe, RWB School Dance Ensemble performance groups, conditioning and modern. Students are prepared using the Cecchetti method for classical ballet exams.

Alumni have gone onto careers on Broadway, Rainbow Stage and Alvin Ailey American Dance Theatre and have continued their education with Arts Umbrella, Goh Ballet, Alberta Ballet, Boston Conservatory and the School of Contemporary Dancers. Students work closely with RWB School Artistic faculty, including award-winning choreographers, and perform new works in festivals and competitions.

The Royal Winnipeg Ballet School, Professional Division is an exclusive, full-time classical ballet training program for students in grades 6 through 12. The school includes approximately 72 young dancers, selected from around the world, and graduates have international careers in top companies in Canada and abroad. The Professional Division instructs students using the Vaganova method of ballet.

David Lee Moroni, a former principal dancer with the RWB, headed the company's professional training program from 1970 to 2003. Moroni's notable students included: Evelyn Hart, David Peregrine, André Lewis, Tara Birtwhistle, and Jennifer Welsman. In 1990 Moroni received the Order of Canada.

From 2003 until 2016, Arlene Minkhorst was Director of the school; in 2016, Stéphane Léonard assumed the role. Since 2015, Suzanne André has been the Principal of the Professional Division, and since 2016, Nicole Kepp has been the Principal of the Recreational Division.

== Choreography ==
In 2002, The Royal Winnipeg Ballet's interpretation of the story of Dracula, choreographed by Mark Godden, was filmed in a made for television titled Dracula: Pages from a Virgin's Diary directed by Guy Maddin. The film was later released theatrically. Godden, who became the RWB's first choreographer in residence in 1991, has created several other major works for the company, including: Angels in the Architecture; Dame Aux Fruits; A Darkness Between Us; Shepherd's Wake; and Svengali.

Canada's Royal Winnipeg Ballet is the first organization to present a theatrical or dance production of the works of Leonard Cohen. During the RWB tenure of Artistic Director Arnold Spohr (1958–1988), in Summer 1970, Brian Macdonald choreographed The Shining People of Leonard Cohen which debuted in Paris. That July, it was staged at Canada's National Arts Centre in Ottawa – with eclectic band Lighthouse opening the show.

In 2002, the Royal Winnipeg Ballet commissioned American choreographer Val Caniparoli for the first full-length ballet, entitled Val Caniparoli's A Cinderella Story using the music of composer Richard Rodgers. "The story was familiar, yet original; the choreography sleek, yet classical; the music, a fresh-sounding amalgam of jazz riffs and swirls, based on the themes of one vintage composer. And it is the belle of the ball".

In May 2012, the company presented the World Premiere of The Doorway - Scenes from Leonard Cohen, a contemporary dance piece based on the words and music of Cohen, choreographed by Jorden Morris. Morris' previous works for the RWB include the highly successful full-length classical ballet Peter Pan (2006) and Moulin Rouge - The Ballet (2009 premiere). In this newest ballet, consisting of five vignettes, Cohen's recorded songs and interviews blend with live music. Hallelujah is performed by musician Allison Crowe (voice and piano) and dancers Sophia Lee and Jo-Ann Sundermeier alternating dates. In November 2012 the RWB toured The Doorway to great acclaim with three live song performances by Crowe.

== Dancers ==
Dancers in the Royal Winnipeg Ballet's 2026–2027 season include:

=== Principals ===
- (Australia) Stephan Azulay
- (Canada) Skylar Campbell
- (Canada) Elizabeth Lamont
- (Italy) Marco Lo Presti
- (Canada) Alanna McAdie

=== Soloists ===
- (Canada) Jaimi Deleau
- (Canada) Julianna Generoux
- (Belgium) Peter Lancksweerdt
- (Canada) Logan Savard
- (Canada) Kyra Soo

=== Second Soloists ===
- (Japan) Rio Fukunaga
- (Canada) Joshua Hidson
- (Canada) Katie Saito
- (Canada) Liam Saito
- (Canada) Maggie Weatherdon

=== Company Artists ===
- Joseph Duffy
- Kallie Green
- Finn Hepting
- Felix Jinga
- Olivia Koppanyi
- Sumin Lee
- Isaac Mueller
- Jackie Oakley
- Samara Rittinger
- Taisi Tollasepp
- Aidan Vaudreuil

=== Apprentices ===
- Adeline Fletcher
- Sienna Going

== See also ==
- Canadian organizations with royal patronage
- Cameron Fraser-Monroe
- Monarchy in Manitoba
