= Betty Farrally =

English-born Canadian dancer, educator and ballet director

- Born: Betty Hey; May 15, 1915; Bradford, Yorkshire, UK
- Died: April 9, 1989 (aged 73); Kelowna, British Columbia, Canada
- Occupation(s): Former Artistic Director of Royal Winnipeg Ballet and Ballet Dancer

Betty Farrally (May 5, 1915 – April 9, 1989) was an English-born Canadian dancer, educator and ballet director. She was co-founder of the Royal Winnipeg Ballet.

The daughter of Arthur Hey and Ada Sugden, she was born Betty Hey in Bradford in 1915 and studied Revived Greek Dance, national dance and ballroom dance. She was educated at Harrogate Ladies' College. She studied dance at the Torch School of Dance in Leeds with Gweneth Lloyd. She came to Winnipeg with Lloyd in 1938. The two established a dance studio, the Canadian School of Ballet, and founded a dance company, the Winnipeg Ballet Club, later the Royal Winnipeg Ballet. Farrally became the club's Principal Dancer and Ballet Mistress and continued to perform until 1950. She then was Artistic Director for the company from 1950 until 1957. Farrally and Lloyd moved to Kelowna, British Columbia, in 1957, where the two founded a branch of the Canadian School of Ballet. Farrally served as Ballet Mistress there until her retirement in 1974. She also served as co-director, with Arnold Spohr, and then artistic advisor, of the Dance Division at the Banff Centre after Lloyd's retirement in 1967.

She married John Hudson Farrally in 1942. Her husband was killed in 1945 and Farrally remarried Ken Ripley for a brief time in 1949.

Farrally received a fellowship award from the Royal Academy of Dance in 1979. She was named an Officer in the Order of Canada in 1981. In 1984, she received the Dance in Canada award.

Farrally died in Kelowna at the age of 73 in 1989. She received the Canadian Conference of the Arts Diplome d'honneur posthumously in May the same year.
