= Cranko =

Cranko is a surname. Notable people with the surname include:

- Deborah Cranko, New Zealand architect
- John Cranko (1927–1973), South African choreographer
