= Arthur Gelber =

Canadian philanthropist (1915–1998)

Arthur Ellis Gelber
- Born: June 22, 1915; Toronto, Ontario, Canada
- Died: January 1, 1998 (aged 82)

Arthur Ellis Gelber, CC (June 22, 1915 – January 1, 1998) was a Canadian philanthropist.

Educated at Upper Canada College, from 1977 to 1980, he was Chair of the Board of Trustees of the National Arts Centre.

In 1989, he established the Lionel Gelber Prize in honour of his brother.

In 1972, he was made an Officer of the Order of Canada and was promoted to Companion in 1994. In 1995, he was awarded the Ramon John Hnatyshyn Award for Voluntarism in the Performing Arts.

Gelber was committed to supporting the arts and served on the boards of more than sixty cultural organizations. Gelber was recognized by the Canadian government for his "strong and generous leadership" in these cultural organizations.

He was married to Esther Salomon. They had four daughters: Nancy, Patricia, Judith, and Sara.
