= Alberta Ballet Company =

Ballet professional company

Alberta Ballet

General information
- Name: Alberta Ballet
- Year founded: 1966
- Founders: Ruth Carse and Muriel Taylor
- Location: Calgary
- Website: albertaballet.com

Senior staff
- Director: Francesco Ventriglia

Artistic staff
- Music director: Peter Dala

Other
- Official school: Alberta Ballet School

Alberta Ballet (also known as the Alberta Ballet Company) was founded by Muriel Taylor and Dr. Ruth Carse in 1958 and became a professional company in 1966. The company is a resident company of both the Northern Alberta Jubilee Auditorium in Edmonton, Alberta and the Southern Alberta Jubilee Auditorium in Calgary, Alberta, and performs its full season in both venues.

== Development ==
Carse directed the company until 1975. She was followed by Jeremy Leslie-Spinks (1975–1976), Brydon Paige (1976–1988), and Ali Pourfarrokh (1988–1998). During Pourfarrokh's tenure, in 1990, the company merged with the Calgary City Ballet and moved into the Nat Christie Centre in Calgary. Since then, it has performed in both Edmonton and Calgary.

Former San Francisco Ballet dancer Mikko Nissinen then directed the company until 2002. Nissinen introduced Balanchine works, while continuing to commission new works from Canadian and international choreographers. He toured the company to China, Finland, and Egypt.

Jean Grand-Maître was then appointed as artistic director in 2002. In 2019 Christopher Anderson was appointed co-artistic director of the company alongside Grand-Maître. This was planned as part of a three-year transition process leading to Anderson becoming full artistic director of the company for the 2022/2023 season.

In June 2023 it was announced that Christopher Anderson and Alberta Ballet had "decided to part ways”. Anderson left the company in December 2023, and began his tenure as dance instructor at the University of South Carolina.

Francesco Ventriglia has been director of the company since January 2024.

== Choreography ==
Artistic director Jean Grand-Maître has choreographed Carmen, which toured China, and Fiddle and the Drum, a collaboration with Joni Mitchell while at the Alberta Ballet. In the spring of 2010, the company built on its ballet and pop collaboration by staging an Elton John production named ELTON: Love Lies Bleeding. Elton John reportedly was so moved by Fiddle and the Drum that he asked Alberta Ballet to produce a ballet for him.

Alberta Ballet was the first Canadian company to stage a ballet by Christopher Wheeldon of the New York City Ballet. Wheeldon choreographed A Midsummer Night's Dream with the company. It also commissioned two pieces from Jorma Elo, of the Boston Ballet.

Canadian choreographer Sabrina Matthews has created pieces the company as well.

== Recent Seasons ==
=== 2015–2016 ===
The season included performances of the glam-rock ballet Love Lies Bleeding, featuring principal dancer Yukichi Hattori in the role of Elton John.

=== 2016–2017 ===
The 2016–2017 season featuring Alberta Ballet company dancers included Dracula, The Nutcracker, Alice in Wonderland, and the World Premiere of Our Canada, a new creation in collaboration with Gordon Lightfoot. Dracula was on-loan from Texas Ballet Theater and choreographed by their artistic director, Ben Stevenson (dancer).

Guest company performances included Shadowland (performed by Pilobolus), a mixed bill from dance company Les Ballets Trockadero de Monte Carlo, and Life (performed by BalletBoyz).

=== 2017–2018 ===
The 2017–2018 season included performances of Tango Fire, Dangerous Liaisons, The Nutcracker, Travis Wall's Shaping Sound, Opus Cactus by MOMIX, Cinderella, All of Us (The Tragically Hip ballet), and Paquita & Other Works.

=== 2018–2019 ===
The 2018–2019 season included performances of The Sleeping Beauty, The Nutcracker, a medley by Ballet BC, de.Vi.ate, A Midsummer Night's Dream, The Fiddle and the Drum, and Les Sylphides and Other Works.

=== 2019–2020 ===
The 2019–2020 season included performances of Taj Express, Frankenstein, The Nutcracker, and Unleashed. This season also featured a guest performance by Diavolo, a Los Angeles-based dance company featured on NBC's America's Got Talent.

In February 2020, Septime Webre's Peter Pan, Swan Lake, and Don Quixote Divertissements were cancelled due to public health concerns over the spread of COVID-19.

=== 2020–2021 ===
Swan Lake and Peter Pan, originally scheduled to be performed during the 2019–2020 season, were scheduled for May 2021 and July 2021 respectively. Jean Grand-Maître's All of Us was also scheduled to be performed in August 2021. Both Peter Pan and All of Us were cancelled on February 24, 2021, and Swan Lake was further postponed.

=== 2021–2022 ===
Alberta Ballet came back in the 2021–2022 season, including performances of Swan Lake, The Nutcracker, Hamlet, Phi, and Cinderella.

=== 2022–2023 ===
The 2022–2023 season included performances of The Handsmaid's Tale, Away We Go, The Nutcracker, Love Rocks, Giselle, and Botero.

=== 2023–2024 ===
The 2023–2024 season included performances of Ballet Hispánico in Doña Perón, The Sleeping Beauty, The Nutcracker, Hansel & Gretel, and Der Wolf & The Rite of Spring. This season also included a guest performance of Hamlet from the Beijing Dance Theater.

=== 2024–2025 ===
The 2024–2025 season included performances of La Sylphide, GRIMM, The Nutcracker, The Winter Gala, The Wizard of Oz, and Don Quixote. This season also included a guest performance from the Dance Theatre of Harlem.

=== 2025–2026 ===
The 2025–2026 season includes performances of Once Upon A Time, which premiered as A Thousand Tales in 2023 on the Dubai Opera Stage, Nijinsky, The Nutcracker, The Winter Gala, Romeo & Juliet, Swan Lake, and Notre Dame de Paris.

== Dancers ==
Dancers of Alberta Ballet (2025–2026):

Name	Nationality	Ranking
Aaron Anker	United States	Principal
Alexandra Anker-Hughes	United States	Principal
Luna Sasaki	Japan	Principal
Caleb Durbin	Australia	Soloist
Allison Perhach	United States	Soloist
Kurtis Grimaldi	Canada	Senior Corps de Ballet
Andrea Arbasino	Italy	Corps de Ballet
Patrice Bertrand	Canada	Corps de Ballet
Paloma Bonnin	Paraguay	Corps de Ballet
Victoria Bourassa	Canada	Corps de Ballet
Zachary Beresow	United States	Corps de Ballet
Grace Campbell	Australia	Corps de Ballet
Zoe Horn	Australia	Corps de Ballet
Bel Johnson-Darby	Australia	Corps de Ballet
Chizuru Kikuchi	Japan	Corps de Ballet
Yaroslav Khudych	Ukraine	Corps de Ballet
Rikuto Kubota	Japan	Corps de Ballet
Jolie Rose Lombardo	United States	Corps de Ballet
Alfonso Maria Guerriero	Italy	Corps de Ballet
Hotaru Maruyama	Japan	Corps de Ballet
Matthew Maxwell	Australia	Corps de Ballet
Mirko Melandri	Italy	Corps de Ballet
Michael Scott-Kahans	Australia	Corps de Ballet
Hinata Takahara	Japan	Corps de Ballet
Isabel Tornqvist	Canada	Corps de Ballet
Yi-Min Tsung	Taiwan	Corps de Ballet
Federico Vitali	Italy	Corps de Ballet
Ian Collins	Mexico	Apprentice
Rémy Gray	Australia	Apprentice
Lulu Manzur	United States	Apprentice
Kate McDonald	Canada	Apprentice
Kali Phillips	United States	Apprentice
Camryn Visser	Canada	Apprentice
Dylan West	United States	Apprentice
Kairi Watanabe	Japan	Supplementary Dancer

== Alberta Ballet School ==
The Professional Division at Alberta Ballet School is a full-time dance and academic training program for students in grades 7 through 12, with a part-time, dance-only option for those in grades 5 and 6. The School's Dedicated Contemporary Dance Stream is available to students in grades 10, 11 and 12 who wish to focus on contemporary dance.

The School is led by Artistic Principal Ashley McNeil and, in 2018, was recognized by Canadian Heritage for its national impact in training artists for professional artistic careers, at the highest levels.

== Other notable artistic staff ==
- David Adams
- Jeremy Leslie-Spinks
- Cherice Barton
- Lambros Lambrou
- Marianne Beausejour
- Scott Harris
- Brian Bender
- Jay Brooker
- Claude Caron
- Nicole Caron
- David Chipman Seibert
- Svea Eklof
- Marc LeClerc
- Mark Mahler
- Daniel McLaren
- Barbara Moore
- Kevin Peterman
- Michel Rahn
- Martin Vallée
- Yumiko Takeshima
- Greg Zane
- Jung Min Hong
- Howard Epstein
- Clark Blakley
- Wayne Mcknight
- Anita Bostok
- Youri Alechine
- Stephanie Achuff
