= Boris Volkoff =

Russian-Canadian dancer (1900–1974)

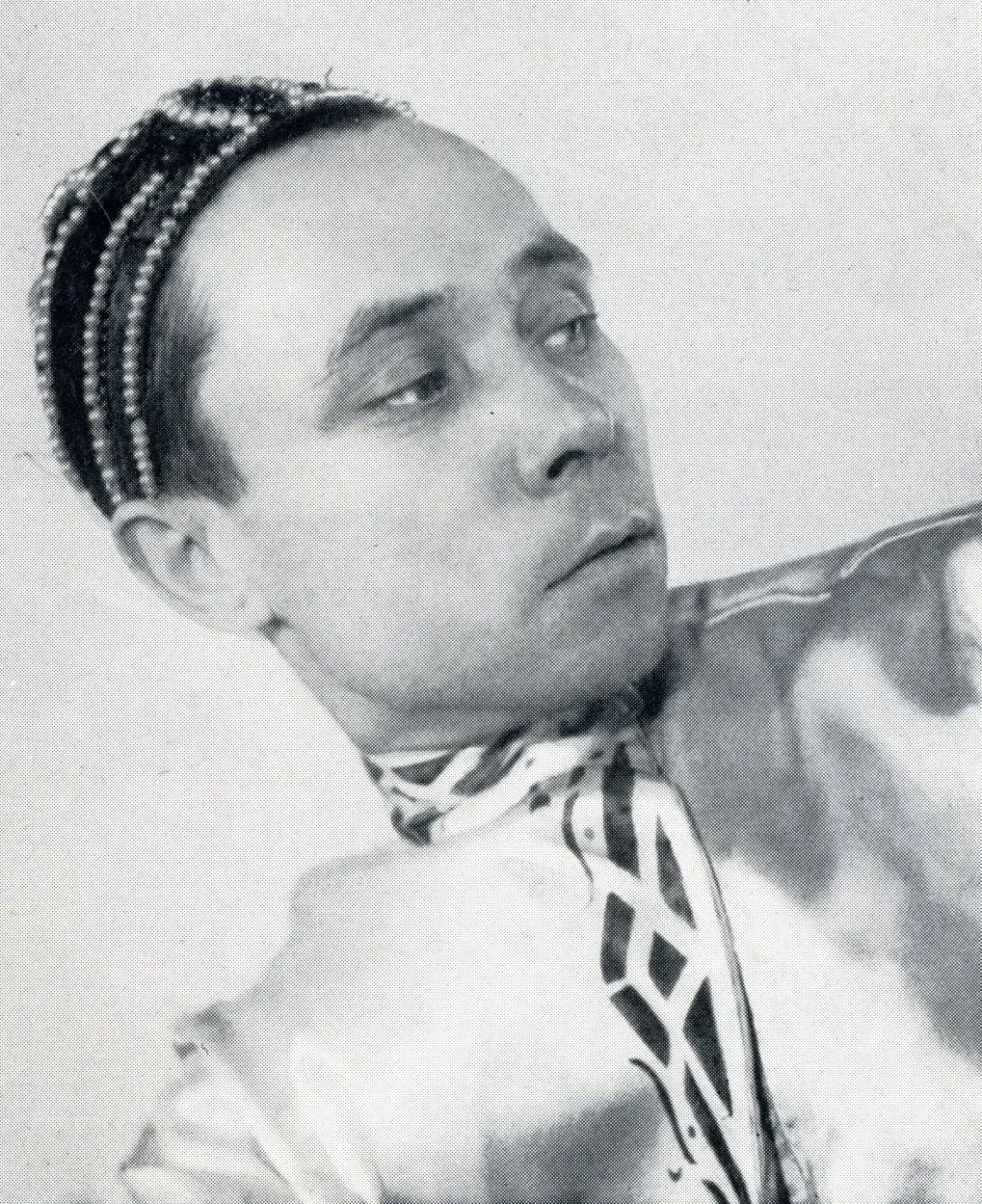
- Volkoff in 1940
- Born: Boris Vladimirovich Baskakoff; April 24, 1900; Belinsky, Penza Oblast, Russian Empire
- Died: March 11, 1974 (aged 73); Toronto, Canada
- Occupations: Dancer; director; ballet master
- Career
- Former groups: Volkoff Canadian Ballet

Boris Vladimirovich Volkoff, CM (Russian: Борис Владимирович Волков; né Baskakoff; April 24, 1900 – March 11, 1974) was a Russian-Canadian ballet dancer, director, choreographer and ballet master. After studying dance in Warsaw and Moscow he defected from Russia and eventually settled in Toronto. He created the Boris Volkoff School of Dance which trained ballet dancers, and the Boris Volkoff Ballet Company which is arguably considered the first ballet company in Canada. He gave his dancers and studio to the National Ballet of Canada to raise the profile of Canadian ballet. He regretted this decision and attempted to revive his company which ended in failure. He was appointed as a Member of the Order of Canada in 1973, one year before his death.

== Early life and dance career ==
Volkoff was born Boris Vladimirovich Baskakoff, was born on April 24, 1900, in Belinsky, Penza Oblast. When he was nine Volkoff joined his brother Igor in Warsaw to dance and perform for the Russian Army. He alternated between using this birth name and performing using the last name Volkoff, his mother's family name.

Volkoff attended the Moscow State Academy of Choreography and later danced with Mordkin Ballet and the Moscow State Youth Ballet. During a Siberian tour Volkoff defected from Russia and went to Shanghai. He joined the Shanghai Variety Ballet and toured with Russian expatriates to various Asian countries and the United States. He danced with Adolph Bolm's company until his visa expired and Volkoff was smuggled into Canada in 1929. He became ballet master at Jack Arthur's Uptown Theatre in Toronto and choreographed short dances that were performed between films. It was during this time that he decided to use Volkoff as his stage name.

== Choreographic works in Toronto ==
In 1930 Volkoff opened the Boris Volkoff School of Dance, which operated until 1974. In 1932 he created ice ballet versions of Swan Lake and Prince Igor with the Toronto Skating Club. He continued creating works for the club for fourteen seasons.

Volkoff brought his dance troupe to the 1936 Summer Olympics to compete in an international dance competition. His company performed two new ballets called Mon-Ka-Ta and Mala, both based on Inuit and Native American legends. The pieces were given five "honourable mentions".

In 1938 the troupe that traveled to Berlin became the Volkoff Canadian Ballet, and later the Boris Volkoff Ballet Company. This company is sometimes considered the first Canadian ballet company. The company performed in many notable venues such as Massey Hall in 1939. Volkoff co-founded the Canadian Ballet Festival with Gweneth Lloyd in 1948 to showcase the talent of Canadian ballet dancers and Volkoff Canadian Ballet was one of three companies to perform at its inaugural event.

On March 2, 1949, Volkoff premiered The Red Ear of Corn, a ballet in two acts. The name refers to red ears of corn found in northern Quebec by huskers. The piece was inspired by Native American and French Canadian dance music. The musical score was composed by John Weinzweig.

== National Ballet of Canada ==
Unable to secure stable funding for the Volkoff Canadian Ballet Volkoff worked with other Canadian ballet enthusiasts to create the National Ballet of Canada. Volkoff and Gweneth Lloyd both wanted to run the new company but they reached a compromise by bringing Celia Franca to be its new artistic director. Volkoff became the company's first resident choreographer.

Volkoff gave his studio and dancers to the National Ballet and taught the male dancers of the company. He regretted this decision as he disliked Celia Franca's "English" dancing style and believed ballet should be performed in the Russian style.

In 1952 Volkoff and David Adams created Toronto Theatre Ballet and became co-artistic directors. The company featured many of the founding members of the National Ballet. He attempted to revive his company in 1953 and 1967 but these ended in failure.

== Personal life ==
Volkoff married Janet Baldwin, a student at his ballet studio. She became his business associate in the operation of his studio.

=== Death ===
Volkoff died March 11, 1974, in Toronto.

== Honours ==
Volkoff was appointed as a Member of the Order of Canada in 1973.

In 2009 Heritage Toronto unveiled a plaque commemorating Volkoff. It was installed at the site of Volkoff's studio at 771 Yonge Street.
