= Nesta Toumine =

Nesta Toumine (October 28, 1912 – February 1, 1996) was a dancer, choreographer, artistic director and teacher in Canada.

She was born Nesta Williams in Thornton Heath, Croydon, England, the daughter of Alfred Edward Williams and Agnes Mary Sievers, and was educated in Ottawa. She studied ballet in Ottawa, New York City, with Nikolai Legat, Serafina Astafieva and Margaret Craske in London, in Paris and with Julia Sedova in Nice. Williams performed as Nesta Markova with the Ballets Russes de Paris and Léonide Massine's Ballet Russe de Monte Carlo.

In 1941, she married Sviatoslov Toumine. The couple settled in New York but moved to Ottawa after the birth of their sons, Peter and Lorne.

With Yolande Leduc, Toumine founded the Ottawa Ballet Company in 1947. She taught ballet in her school in Ottawa, in Scranton, Pennsylvania and in Montreal.

Toumine died in Ottawa.

Dancers trained by Toumine include:

- David Lee Moroni, founding principal of the professional division of the Royal Winnipeg Ballet School
- David Peregrine, former principal dancer for the Royal Winnipeg Ballet

Toumine developed the choreography for a number of ballets including:

- Maria Chapdelaine
- Les Sylphides
- Les Valses
- Pas de Quatre

She also choreographed shows for the Orpheus Musical Theatre Society.

The Society of Russian Ballet established the Nesta Toumine Memorial Award in 1996.
