= Gweneth Lloyd =

Canadian ballet teacher and choreographer

- Born: September 15, 1901; Eccles, Lancashire, UK
- Died: January 1, 1993 (aged 91); Kelowna, British Columbia, Canada
- Occupation(s): Former Artistic Director of Royal Winnipeg Ballet and Choreographer

Gweneth Lloyd, OC (September 15, 1901 – January 1, 1993) was a co-founder of the Royal Winnipeg Ballet, a ballet teacher and choreographer.

Lloyd was born in Eccles, Lancashire, United Kingdom. She attended The Perse School in Cambridge, but began taking dance when she attended Northwood College. In 1927 she and Doris McBride open their own dance school in Leeds. It was here that Lloyd met student Betty Farrally (née Hey) who would accompany Lloyd to Winnipeg, Manitoba, Canada in 1938. They opened the Canadian School of Ballet on Portage Avenue and shortly afterwards founded the Winnipeg Ballet Club, that in 1953 became the Royal Winnipeg Ballet. The first performance of the Winnipeg Ballet Club was part of a production in Montreal, celebrating the visit of Princess Elizabeth (not yet Queen) and her husband Prince Philip to Canada in May, 1939 (followed by a visit to Winnipeg). Lloyd also founded the dance program at the Banff School of Fine Arts (now The Banff Centre) in 1948. She choreographed 36 works between 1939 and 1952. Her choreographic notes were destroyed in a fire at the Royal Winnipeg Ballet in 1954. Although she received the appointment as Director of Ballet, she left Winnipeg in 1950 to move to Toronto, where she established another branch of the Canadian School of Ballet, formed the short-lived Toronto Festival Dancers, and continued her choreography. Her work Shadow on the Prairie was filmed by the National Film Board in 1954. Anna Blewchamp successfully enacted a stage reconstruction of Lloyd's The Wise Virgins with help from former dancers in 1992 and the performance was video-recorded. Later Lloyd and Betty Farrally moved to Kelowna in 1958, where they opened a branch of the Canadian School of Ballet. She continued her teaching throughout British Columbia as well as choreographing works for the Kelowna Little Theatre and Vernon Little Theatre. She was also an examiner for the Royal Academy of Dancing.

Lloyd was awarded the Order of Canada in 1969, a Fellowship Award from the Royal Academy of Dance in 1979, and the Diplôme d’honneur from the Canadian Conference for the Arts in 1989. She received the Governor General's Performing Arts Award for Lifetime Achievement in 1992.

Lloyd died in Kelowna in 1993.
