= Ten Thousand Men of Harvard =

Harvard University fight song

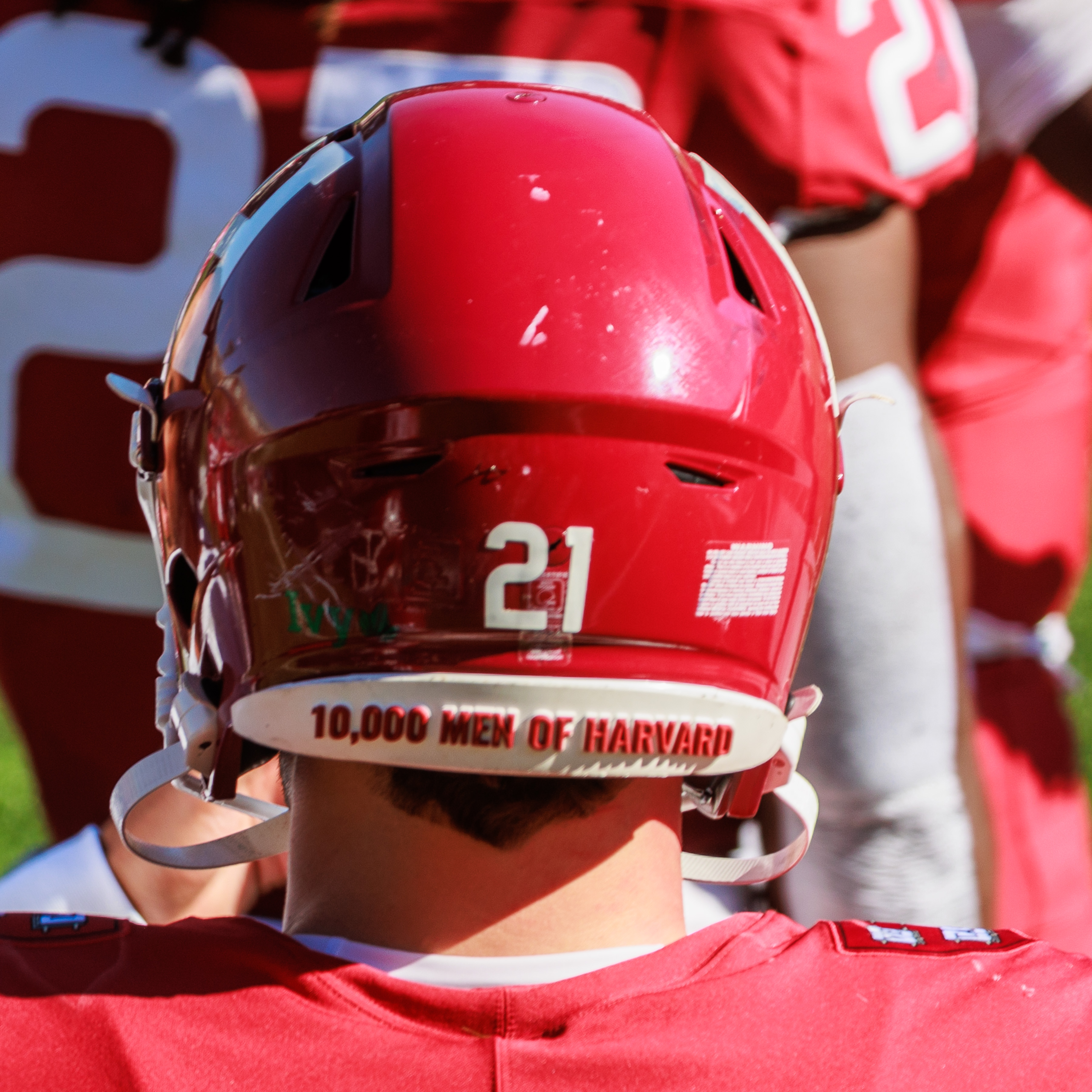
The slogan is imprinted on the back of Harvard football helmets

"Ten Thousand Men of Harvard" is the most frequently performed of Harvard University's fight songs. Composed by Murray Taylor and lyrics by A. Putnam of Harvard College's class of 1918, it is among the fight songs performed by the Harvard Glee Club at its annual joint concert with the Yale Glee Club the night before the annual Harvard-Yale football game, as well as at the game itself. It is also played or sung at other athletic meets or other intercollegiate contests, usually by the Harvard University Band.

To acquaint incoming freshmen with the song, early each academic year the band performs it in Harvard Yard, where most freshmen live. The football team sings it after wins, and new players are required to memorize it in both English and dog Latin.

In 1991, this song was one of the songs played by Mission Control to awaken the STS-37 crew.

In the 2018 film On the Basis of Sex, which portrays the life and early cases of United States Supreme Court Justice Ruth Bader Ginsburg, "Ten Thousand Men" plays as Ginsburg begins the first day of classes as one of only nine women among five hundred incoming Harvard Law School students.

== Lyrics ==
The original lyrics are:

Ten Thousand Men of Harvard want victory today
For they know that ov'r old Eli
Fair Harvard holds sway.
So then we'll conquer all old Eli's men,
And when the game ends we'll sing again:
Ten thousand men of Harvard gained vict'ry today.

In 1953 a verse in dog Latin was composed by Allan R. Robinson (Harvard College class of 1954), Edward Upton (class of 1953), and Charles Lipson (class of 1954), consisting of a nonsensical sequence of Latin clichés:

Illegitimum non carborundum;
Domine salvum fac.
Illegitimum non carborundum;
Domine salvum fac.
Gaudeamus igitur!
Veritas non sequitur?
Illegitimum non carborundum—ipso facto!

(Illegitimum non carborundum is the Harvard Band's motto.) Other verses have lewd dog Latin lyrics (obscured by loud drumming), or just the syllable la repeated over and over.

== See also ==
- Fight Fiercely, Harvard
- Harvardiana
