= Lila York =

American dancer and choreographer (born 1948)

Lila York (born 29 November 1948) is an American dancer and choreographer from New York City. She studied English literature at Skidmore College before studying ballet and modern dance at the Martha Graham Center of Contemporary Dance with Paul Sanasardo. York joined the Paul Taylor Dance Company in 1973, where she danced for more than a decade. After leaving the company, she left the "very heart of American modern dance" to become one of "ballet's most sought-after choreographers," working with many of the world's foremost ballet companies.

== Early life and training ==
York was born on 29 November 1948 in Syracuse, New York. She began taking classical ballet classes recreationally at the age of thirteen from Gertrude Hallenbeck. She graduated as an English literature major from Skidmore College in Saratoga Springs, New York, with aspirations of becoming a writer. Shortly after, York had a change of heart and decided to pursue ballet and modern dance at the Martha Graham Center of Contemporary Dance and received a two-year scholarship to train under Paul Sanasardo. She also took classes with the Alvin Ailey American Dance Theater. She was the editorial assistant at Grove Press and a waitress while training as a dancer in New York.

== Career ==
New York magazine called York "the finest [dancer] by far" to have belonged to the Paul Taylor Dance Company. She joined the company in 1973 where she created numerous roles in many of Paul Taylor's works. At 5 ft 0 in (152 cm) tall, Taylor said to York, "I'm not taking you because of your height; I'm taking you in spite of your height." Critics have often referred to York as the long time muse of Taylor. Her first piece at the dance company was Esplanade; the first piece Taylor choreographed after retiring as a dancer. York called the piece "one of his most important works".

York left the company in 1985 and collaborated with Martha Clarke on Vienna: Lusthaus and the play The Garden of Earthly Delights which won the Drama Desk Award for Unique Theatrical Experience. York's signature piece, Rapture, was created in 1995 for the Juilliard Dance Ensemble. She created the piece in memory of two colleagues, Clark Tippett and Christopher Gillis, who died from AIDS complications during the 80s AIDS epidemic. Rapture is set to excerpts from Sergei Prokofiev's No. 3 and No. 5 piano concertos and was widely critically acclaimed. Bruce Marks, the director of Boston Ballet, was at the premiere performance and said, "I was just knocked out. I was struck by her ability to bring out the quality of each dancer, and the energy and originality in music I knew very well. I went because Lila was staging Taylor's Company B for us, and then I was on my feet with everyone else."

In 1996, Boston Ballet commissioned York to create Celts. Her motivations behind the piece were to celebrate her heritage and also, in part, her parents' fiftieth wedding anniversary. Christine Temin from The Boston Globe called the work "an astonishing array of dance images of Ireland, a piece that is both profound and thrilling." An excerpt from the piece previewed during halftime at a Boston Celtics basketball game in November 1996.

In 2013, York adapted Margaret Atwood's dystopian novel The Handmaid's Tale into a full-length ballet for the Royal Winnipeg Ballet. It was remounted and performed at the National Arts Centre in Ottawa in 2015 for the 30th anniversary of the novel. Holly Harris from the Winnipeg Free Press said "York's vision breathes new life into a venerable Canadian classic while literally embodying the story's dark forces, with its sobering message as timely -- and relevant -- as ever." York has expressed that she is "interested in ballet taking on story ballets that speak to our time and our issues".

Tobi Tobias from New York magazine said, "her choreographic technique is wonderfully able" and that "York knows how to calibrate her movement vocabulary, how to keep her stage picture compelling, how to work solo or paired figures against large, spontaneous-looking ensemble formations, how to establish mood without lapsing into portentousness or sentimentality."

She has choreographed works for such companies as Atlanta Ballet, Ballet Memphis, Ballet West, the Birmingham Royal Ballet, Cincinnati Ballet, Colorado Ballet, Houston Ballet, Kansas City Ballet, Louisville Ballet, Milwaukee Ballet, Norwegian National Ballet, Orlando Ballet, Pacific Northwest Ballet, Paul Taylor Dance Company, Pennsylvania Ballet, San Francisco Ballet, the Scottish Ballet, Tulsa Ballet, the Royal Danish Ballet, and Washington Ballet.

== Personal life ==
York was married to Donald York, a composer, for much of her dancing career. They had been long-time friends and dated in middle school. She introduced him to Taylor and Donald York became the musical director, conductor, pianist, composer, and arranger for the Paul Taylor Dance Company. In an interview with Dance Magazine, she stated she's "half-Irish, half-Scot".

== Works ==
=== Choreographed works ===
- All American (2001)
- Breathless (2002)
- Celts (1996)
- Concerto 488 Sense of Spring (2000)
- Concerto in Pieces (2000)
- Continuum (2017)
- Coronach (2013)
- Echoes of the Jazz Age (2000)
- El Grito (1997)
- Gloria (1999)
- Memoir 2 (2000)
- Millions of Instructions Per Second (2004)
- Ode to Joy (1998)
- Postcards from Home (2004)
- Psalms (1992)
- Rapture (1995)
- Rules of the Game (1999)
- Sanctum (1997)
- Shoot the Moon (2003)
- Strays (1991)
- The America Variations (1995)
- The Handmaid’s Tale (2014)
- The Ring (1985)
- Windhover (1995)

=== Chamber works ===
- Beloved (1991)
- L’Histoire du Soldat (1988)
- Memoir (1998)
- Pilgrim’s Song (2005)
- Requiem (1990)
- Sharehi (1989)
- Solo (1986)
- Sostenuto (2008)
- Widow’s Walk (2004)
