= Illegitimi non carborundum =

Mock-Latin aphorism

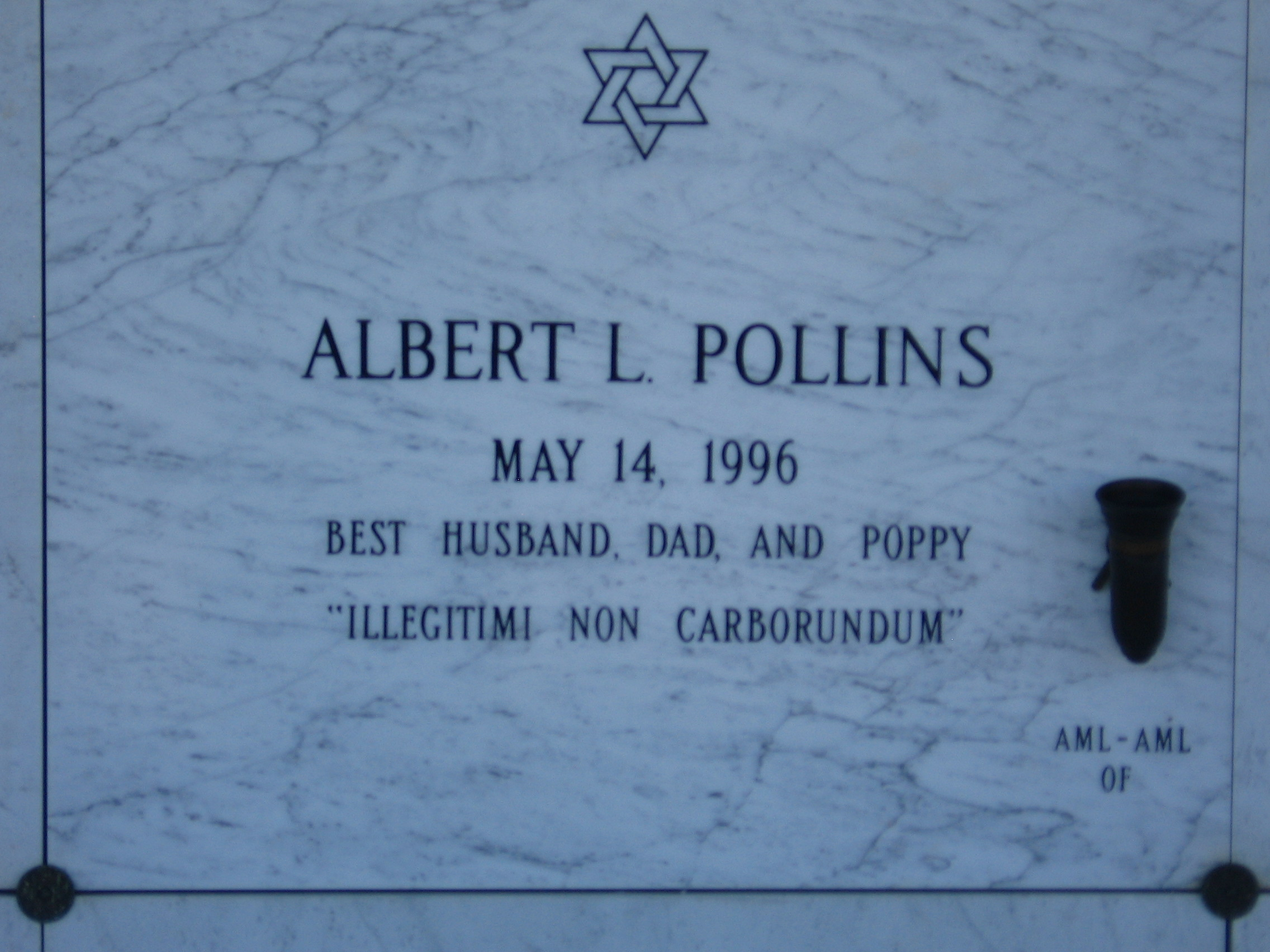
A gravestone inscribed with the phrase

Illegitimi non carborundum is a mock-Latin aphorism, often translated as "Don't let the bastards grind you down". The phrase itself has no meaning in Latin and can only be mock-translated.

== History ==
The phrase originated during World War II. Lexicographer Eric Partridge attributes it to British army intelligence very early in the war (using the dative plural illegitimis).

The phrase was adopted by US Army General "Vinegar" Joe Stilwell as his motto during the war, in the form Illegitimati non carborundum. It was later further popularized in the US by 1964 presidential candidate Barry Goldwater.

The phrase is also used as the first line of one of the extra dog Latin verses added in 1953 to an unofficial school song at Harvard University, "Ten Thousand Men of Harvard". This most frequently played fight song of the Harvard University Band is, to some extent, a parody of more solemn school songs like "Fair Harvard thy Sons to your Jubilee Throng". The first verse is a nonsense sequence of Latin clichés:

Illegitimum non carborundum;
Domine salvum fac.
Illegitimum non carborundum;
Domine salvum fac.
Gaudeamus igitur!
Veritas non sequitur?
Illegitimum non carborundum—ipso facto!

The phrase, often accompanied by an English translation, has appeared in many places:

- 1958, the novel Saturday Night and Sunday Morning, and film of the same name, as the motto of the main character, Arthur Seaton.
- 1959, Henry Slesar's mystery novel set in an advertising office The Grey Flannel Shroud (though not in its 1958 publication in Cosmopolitan
- 1963, possibly earlier, as illegitimus non carborundum used as the motto incorporated into the masthead of the Whitehorse Star newspaper.
- 1967, the song "Bill and Annie", on the album Running, Jumping, Standing Still by Spider John Koerner and Willie Murphy.
- 1978, the movie Go Tell the Spartans, in the form Non Corabundum Illigitimi.
- 1982, the song "(Don't Let 'Em) Grind Ya Down", on the album Iron Fist by Motörhead.
- 1982, as the motto of on the city crest of Mellonville, in the SCTV episode "Mellonvote".
- 1984, the motto of 2nd battalion, 1st Special Forces Group
- 1985 (as Nolite te Bastardes Carborundorum), the novel The Handmaid's Tale. The phrase is depicted as graffiti representing a "silent revolt" by a "slave woman in a futuristic totalitarian regime". Vanity Fair called the phrase a "feminist rallying cry".
- 1990, the chorus of "Don't Let the Bastards (Get You Down)", on the album Third World Warrior by Kris Kristofferson is "Don't let the bastards get you down".
- 1991, the final line of the chorus in the U2 song "Acrobat" is "Don't let the bastards grind you down".
- 1997, the second-wave ska band The Toasters' song "Don't Let the Bastards Grind You Down" appeared in the pilot episode of the animated series Mission Hill.
- 2011, the chorus of "Cheers (Drink to That)", a single on Rihanna's album Loud repeats "Don't let the bastards get you down".
- 2013, "Don't Let the Bastards Get You Down", a song on the album Meet Me at the Edge of the World by the Ohio band Over the Rhine".
- 2014, the desk of former Speaker of the U.S. House of Representatives John Boehner.
- 2024, chapter title in Anthony Fauci's memoir On Call: A Doctor's Journey in Public Health.
- 2025, "Don't Let the Bastards Get You Down", a single from the album Hard Headed Woman by Margo Price. Price's song was inspired by Kristofferson whispering the phrase to Sinead O Connor at Bob Dylan's 30th Anniversary Concert Celebration in 1992.

== "Latin" meaning ==
The sentence is Dog Latin; that is, it is a Latin–English pun with only a mock translation.

The first word varies between illegitimi and illegitimis. Illegitimi is presumably the nominative plural of illegitimus meaning "unlawful" or "outlaw" in Latin, but interpreted as English "illegitimate" in the sense of "bastard" – in this case, used as a generic insult.

Illegitimis may be intended as an ablative plural, but if carborundum is intended to resemble a gerundive, it is more likely intended as a dative plural, since the gerundive takes a dative of agent. The meaning, in either case, is "by the outlaws/bastards."

The second word non is a straightforward negation.

The third word, carborundum, is an abrasive used for industrial grinding. It is not a Latin word; instead, it is a trademark derived from the word corundum, a word of Tamil origin. However, it resembles a Latin gerundive, so can be interpreted as a hypothetical "fit to be carborere-ed" or "to be carborere-ed".

If carborere (third conjugation) were a Latin word meaning "to grind down", Illegitimis non carborundum would be correct Latin for "‍(It/One) must not be ground down by the illegitimates".

There are many variants of the phrase, such as Illegitimis non carborundum, Noli illegitimi carborundum and Nil illegitimi carborundum, all of them Dog Latin. Sometimes (as in The Handmaid's Tale), carborundum is prolonged to carborundorum, as if a second declension neuter genitive plural of a noun ending in -um. This is purely jocular and cannot have a grammatical meaning in Latin.

A closer translation would be "noli pati te nebulones conterere" (more literally "do not permit those scoundrels to crush you").

== See also ==
- List of Latin phrases
