= Jere Gillis =

American-born Canadian ice hockey player, actor, and stuntman

- Born: January 18, 1957 (age 69) Bend, Oregon, U.S.
- Height: 6 ft 0 in (183 cm)
- Weight: 202 lb (92 kg; 14 st 6 lb)
- Position: Left wing
- Shot: Left
- Played for: Vancouver Canucks; New York Rangers; Quebec Nordiques; Buffalo Sabres; Philadelphia Flyers; Brunico (Serie A); Solihull Barons (BHL); Peterborough Pirates (BHL)
- NHL draft: 4th overall, 1977; Vancouver Canucks
- WHA draft: 7th overall, 1977; Cincinnati Stingers
- Playing career: 1977–1991

Jere Alan Gillis (born January 18, 1957) is an American-born Canadian former professional ice hockey player, actor and stuntman.

== Background ==
Gillis was born in Bend, Oregon and raised in Montreal, the son of skier Gene Gillis (a member of the American alpine skiing team for the 1948 Winter Olympics), and Rhona Wurtele, a Canadian Olympic skier who competed at the 1948 Winter Olympics. His sister Margie Gillis is a dancer and choreographer, and member of the Order of Canada. His older brother Christopher Gillis was also an important dancer and choreographer, and a member of the Paul Taylor Dance Company.

== Playing career ==
As a youth, Gillis played in the 1970 Quebec International Pee-Wee Hockey Tournament with a minor ice hockey team from Mount Royal, Quebec.

Drafted fourth overall in the 1977 NHL amateur draft by the Vancouver Canucks, Gillis played in the National Hockey League (NHL) from 1977 to 1987 for the Canucks, New York Rangers, Quebec Nordiques, Buffalo Sabres and Philadelphia Flyers. From 1988 to 1991, he played in the United Kingdom for Solihull Barons and Peterborough Pirates, finally playing five games in the Quebec Senior Provincial Hockey League in 1996–97.

== Personal life ==
Upon retiring from ice hockey he became a stuntman in movies as well as a Scientologist.

== Career statistics ==
=== Regular season and playoffs ===
| | | | Regular season | | | | | Playoffs |
| Season | Team | League | GP | G | A | Pts | PIM | GP | G | A | Pts | PIM |
|---|---|---|---|---|---|---|---|---|---|---|---|---|
| 1973–74 | Sherbrooke Castors | QMJHL | 69 | 20 | 19 | 39 | 96 | 5 | 1 | 2 | 3 | 0 |
| 1974–75 | Sherbrooke Castors | QMJHL | 54 | 38 | 57 | 95 | 89 | 9 | 5 | 3 | 8 | 2 |
| 1975–76 | Sherbrooke Castors | QMJHL | 60 | 47 | 55 | 102 | 40 | 17 | 8 | 14 | 22 | 27 |
| 1976–77 | Sherbrooke Castors | QMJHL | 72 | 55 | 85 | 140 | 80 | 18 | 11 | 12 | 23 | 40 |
| 1977–78 | Vancouver Canucks | NHL | 79 | 23 | 18 | 41 | 35 | — | — | — | — | — |
| 1978–79 | Vancouver Canucks | NHL | 78 | 13 | 12 | 25 | 33 | 1 | 0 | 1 | 1 | 0 |
| 1979–80 | Vancouver Canucks | NHL | 67 | 13 | 17 | 30 | 108 | — | — | — | — | — |
| 1980–81 | Vancouver Canucks | NHL | 11 | 0 | 4 | 4 | 4 | — | — | — | — | — |
| 1980–81 | New York Rangers | NHL | 35 | 10 | 10 | 20 | 4 | 14 | 2 | 5 | 7 | 9 |
| 1981–82 | New York Rangers | NHL | 26 | 3 | 9 | 12 | 16 | — | — | — | — | — |
| 1981–82 | Quebec Nordiques | NHL | 12 | 2 | 1 | 3 | 0 | — | — | — | — | — |
| 1981–82 | Fredericton Express | AHL | 28 | 2 | 17 | 19 | 10 | — | — | — | — | — |
| 1982–83 | Buffalo Sabres | NHL | 3 | 0 | 0 | 0 | 0 | — | — | — | — | — |
| 1982–83 | Rochester Americans | AHL | 53 | 18 | 24 | 42 | 69 | 16 | 1 | 7 | 8 | 11 |
| 1983–84 | Vancouver Canucks | NHL | 37 | 9 | 13 | 22 | 7 | 4 | 2 | 1 | 3 | 0 |
| 1983–84 | Fredericton Express | AHL | 36 | 22 | 28 | 50 | 35 | — | — | — | — | — |
| 1984–85 | Vancouver Canucks | NHL | 37 | 5 | 11 | 16 | 23 | — | — | — | — | — |
| 1984–85 | Fredericton Express | AHL | 7 | 2 | 1 | 3 | 2 | — | — | — | — | — |
| 1985–86 | Fredericton Express | AHL | 29 | 4 | 14 | 18 | 21 | — | — | — | — | — |
| 1986–87 | Philadelphia Flyers | NHL | 1 | 0 | 0 | 0 | 0 | — | — | — | — | — |
| 1986–87 | Hershey Bears | AHL | 47 | 13 | 22 | 35 | 32 | 5 | 0 | 0 | 0 | 9 |
| 1986–87 | HC Sierre | NDA | 3 | 2 | 3 | 5 | 0 | — | — | — | — | — |
| 1987–88 | SG Brunico | ITA | 24 | 20 | 16 | 36 | 10 | — | — | — | — | — |
| 1988–89 | Solihull Barons | GBR | 18 | 46 | 47 | 93 | 12 | — | — | — | — | — |
| 1989–90 | Solihull Barons | GBR | 30 | 50 | 35 | 85 | 16 | 4 | 2 | 4 | 6 | 6 |
| 1990–91 | Peterborough Pirates | GBR | 6 | 13 | 4 | 17 | 22 | — | — | — | — | — |
| 1996–97 | Acton Vale Nova | QSPHL | 5 | 0 | 3 | 3 | 2 | — | — | — | — | — |
| NHL totals | | | 386 | 78 | 95 | 173 | 230 | 19 | 4 | 7 | 11 | 9 |
| AHL totals | | | 200 | 61 | 106 | 167 | 169 | 21 | 1 | 7 | 8 | 20 |

=== International ===
| Year | Team | Event | GP | G | A | Pts | PIM |
|---|---|---|---|---|---|---|---|
| 1976 | Canada | WJC | 4 | 1 | 2 | 3 | 2 |

- All statistics are taken from eliteprospects.com.

Awards and achievements
| Preceded by Rick Blight | Vancouver Canucks first-round draft pick 1977 | Succeeded by Bill Derlago |
| Preceded by Peter Marsh | Cincinnati Stingers first round draft pick 1977 | Succeeded by None |
