= List of works performed by The Royal Ballet =

This is an alphabetical list of works performed by The Royal Ballet, a classical ballet company based at the Royal Opera House, Covent Garden, London, in the United Kingdom.

== A ==
Title	Choreographer	Composer	Designer	RB Premiere	Notes
Acheron's Dream	Matthew Hart	Aaron Copland		20 June 2000	One performance, staged in the Linbury Studio Theatre
Acte de Présence	Frederick Ashton	Pyotr Il'yich Tchaikovsky		18 October 1984	Ashton created this work for himself and Margot Fonteyn. It was performed at the centennial gala of the Metropolitan Opera House, and at the Royal Opera House during a Gala Tribute to celebrate Ashton's 80th birthday
Young Apollo	David Bintley	Gordon Crosse; Benjamin Britten	Victor Pasmore	17 November 1984	The music composition is an extended version of a piece originally written by Britten,
