= Whitehorse Star =

Canadian newspaper

- Illegitmus non carborundum
- Type: Afternoon newspaper (Monday, Wednesday, Friday)
- Format: Tabloid
- Publisher: Michele Pierce
- Editor: Jim Butler
- Founded: 1900
- Ceased publication: 2024
- Language: English
- Headquarters: 2149 Second Avenue; Whitehorse, Yukon, Canada
- ISSN: 2564-5994
- Website: whitehorsestar.com

The Whitehorse Star was a newspaper in Whitehorse, Yukon, Canada.

== History ==
The newspaper was founded in 1900 about a year after the Klondike Gold Rush ended. The paper was originally called the Northern Star, by was later changed to the White Horse Star, Whitehorse Daily Star and since 2019 as the Whitehorse Star.

In June 1950, Horace Moore sold the newspaper to Tom Bain, who had been editor of the Cambie News in Vancouver for 12 years. The new owner doubled the physical paper's size and the number of pages. Circulation rose to 2,300. Bain sold the paper to Harry Boyle of Vancouver in October 1954. Boyle bought a Linotype machine for the paper from the Dawson Weekly News, which had closed. The press was replaced in 1960 by a used Harris offset printing press which a year later allowed The Star to start publishing twice a week on Mondays and Thursdays.

Boyle is responsible for The Star adopting its official motto, "Illegitimus non Carborundum", a Dog Latin aphorism meaning "You mustn't let the bastards grind you down". The motto is incorporated into the newspaper's logo, and is displayed on its website.

Jackie Pierce owned the Whitehorse Star from 2002 until her death in 2023. In April 2024, the newspaper announced it will cease and publish its final edition on May 17 after efforts to sell the paper failed and following years of financial difficulties. In response, ex-Star journalist Max Fraser launched the "Save the Star" fundraising campaign on Indiegogo with the goal to raise $400,000 to either buy the Star, or if the effort failed, start a new publication called the Yukon Star. The Star's owners said they will not sell and will close the business as planned. They wished anyone who wanted to start a newspaper in Yukon "the best of luck in rolling out a quality product." The "Save the Star" campaign was paused after raising $17,000. Fraser said he will proceed with "Plan B" to launch a new publication, but would return all money raised if the newspaper failed to materialize. The Star's building in downtown Whitehorse was put up sale and emptied before July. The Yukon Star launched with five former Whitehorse Star staffers hired. The publication was online-only at first but began publishing in print weekly starting in May 2024. The Yukon Star ceased after four months due to lack of funds.

== Notable staff ==
Flo Whyard, who has served as the mayor of Whitehorse, is among the newspaper's former editors.

== Distribution ==
When it was founded in 1900, the newspaper appeared only once a week, and its progress to Monday through Friday publication occurred in fits and starts; it was issued twice a week for a time, and then three times a week in the 1960s and five times a week from around 1980 to 1982. In 1982, the paper changed to publishing three times a week. The paper returned to publishing five times a week in 1985 until 2019. In 2022 it adopted a Monday-Wednesday-Friday print schedule, with updates on the website on other days. The afternoon newspaper, usually available after 3 p.m., had a cover price of $1.00.

In early April 2024, the newspaper announced plans to publish its final edition on May 17, after efforts by co-owner and publisher Michele Pierce to develop a new business strategy to deal with years of financial difficulties blamed on the move of advertising from print to online, or to sell the paper, failed.

== Criticism ==
The Star has been criticised for publishing racist depictions and opinions about minority groups. In particular Indigenous and Black people. The newspaper has been accused of promoting racist stereotypes about people of colour and targeting non-white Yukoners in its coverage.

The newspaper's active online comments section has also been criticized for platforming hateful views against Indigenous people.

Yukon residents have noted that the copy editing tables at the Star were decorated with pages from 1980s issues featuring photos of children performing in blackface.

The Star acknowledged that the semi-weekly paper preceding the daily encouraged anti-Asian sentiment.

The Star published frequently on the topics of alleged Sasquatch and UFO sightings.
