= Rhona and Rhoda Wurtele =

Canadian skiers

Rhona and Rhoda Wurtele CM
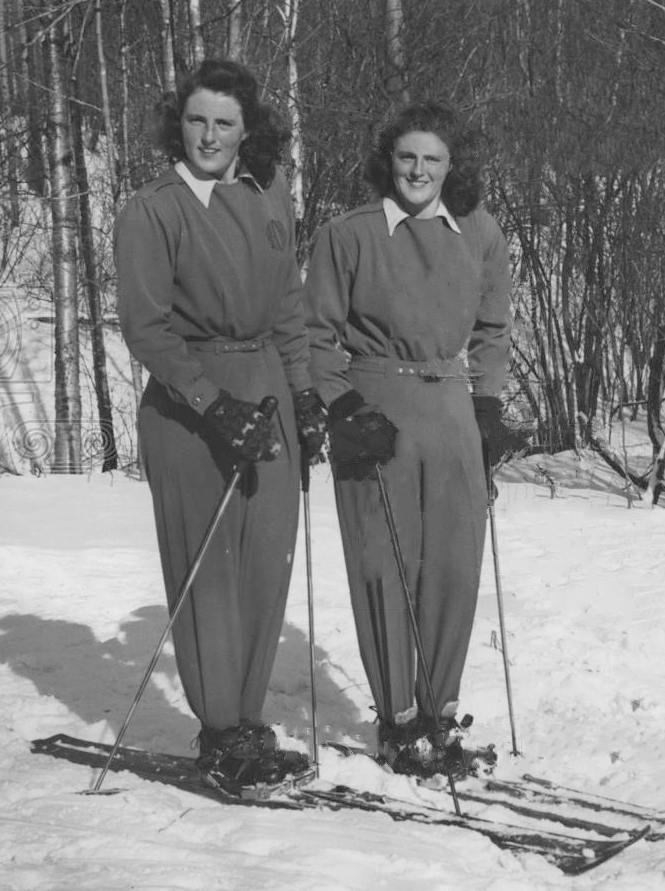
- Rhona (left) and Rhoda (Right) in 1945

Personal information
- Born: Grace Rhona Wurtele; January 21, 1922; St. Lambert, Quebec, Canada
- Died: January 17, 2020 (aged 97); Montreal, Quebec, Canada
- Other name: Rhona Wurtele Gillis
- Born: Isabella Rhoda Wurtele; January 21, 1922 (age 104); St. Lambert, Quebec, Canada
- Other name: Rhoda Wurtele Eaves

Sport
- Country: Canada
- Sport: Alpine skiing

Rhona (January 21, 1922 – January 17, 2020) and Rhoda Wurtele CM (born January 21, 1922) are identical twins and Canada's women's skiing pioneers and champions of the 1940s and 1950s. Together they made up the entire 1948 Olympic Women's Alpine team for Canada.

With the death of Canadian Olympian David Howard at age 104 on January 21, 2023, Rhoda Wurtele became the oldest living Canadian Olympian on her 101st birthday, and with French longjumper Yvonne Curtet's death on February 21, 2025, also at age 104, she became the world's oldest living Olympian at 103.

== Lives and careers ==
The Wurtele twins were born in 1922 in the province of Quebec. They began skiing at age five when their father strapped two planks of wood onto their feet and pushed them out the front door; on top of Mount Royal in Montreal. The twins never stopped skiing. By age 11 they had skied off the senior ski jump on Mount Royal (women were finally allowed to compete in ski jumping at the Olympic games in 2014). For their secondary education, they attended Trafalgar School for Girls in Montreal.

They were Canada's first official women's Olympic alpine ski team, and competed in Canada and the United States from 1942 to 1948, representing the Penguin Ski Club. They were married in a double ceremony at St. Stephen's Church in Montreal on November 13, 1948. They continued to compete through to 1959 even after they had children. As soon as they began competing in 1942, they won almost every race they entered, in Canada and the United States - including the Kate Smith International, the Alta Cup, the Roch Cup, the Silver Dollar Derby and in the 1950s, the Harriman Cup. In 1943 Rhoda swept the Taschereau downhill at Mont Tremblant, Quebec, winning by 24 seconds, bettering both the women and all the men in the competition. Rhona placed second among the women, ninth overall.

World War II caused the cancellation of two Olympics in a row; the twins were finally able to compete at the 1948 Winter Olympics, making up the entire Canadian Women's Alpine Team. However, Rhoda injured her ankle during a training run and withdrew from the Olympics, and Rhona broke her leg in the downhill, finishing last, and withdrew from other events. Rhoda was able to recover enough to tie for third place in the prestigious Arlberg Kandehar at Chamonix just a few weeks later. She later competed in all three alpine skiing events at the 1952 Winter Olympics with the best result of ninth place in the giant slalom.

Despite their disappointments at the Olympics, the Wurtele twins continued competing and eventually turned to teaching skiing, first to children (through the Ski Jays and Ski Chicks clubs, founded by the Penguin Ski Club), then in the 1960s to the mothers who brought their children to the slopes. Well into their 90s, they remained active with some cross-country skiing and golf (they were at one-time members of the Quebec provincial team in golfing). As pioneers, they set the stage for Canadian women in skiing, directly influencing a long line of medal winners from Lucile Wheeler, the first woman to win an Olympic skiing medal for Canada, to Anne Heggtveit, Nancy Greene, Kathy Kreiner and Kerrin Lee-Gartner.

Rhona was the mother of noted Canadian dancers Margie Gillis and Christopher Gillis, acrobatic skier Nancy Gillis and of ice hockey player Jere Gillis. Her husband Gene was included on the American alpine skiing team for the 1948 Olympics. Like his wife, he injured himself during a training run and withdrew from all events. She died in Montreal in 2020, four days prior to her 98th birthday.

Rhoda is the mother of Bruce Eaves, golf and ski teacher David Eaves, and world champion acrobatic skier John Eaves.

== Honours ==
In 1945 the twins were awarded the Velma Springstead Rose Bowl as Best Canadian Woman Athlete (sic) of 1944, presented by the Women's Amateur Athletic Federation. In 1946 they were runners-up for the Lou Marsh Trophy, given by the Canadian Press to Canada's Most Outstanding Athlete. They were inducted into the Canadian Amateur Athletic Hall of Fame in 1953 for both their swimming and skiing achievements. Both were inducted into the U.S. National Ski Hall of Fame (now the American Ski and Snowboard Hall of Fame) in 1969 and to the Canadian Ski Hall of Fame in 1982.

They were named Members of the Order of Canada, by Governor General Julie Payette, on December 27, 2018.

Other honours have included:

- induction to the Laurentian Ski Hall of Fame, St-Sauveur-des-Monts, Québec in 1986
- induction to the Musée du Ski de Québec at Mont Ste-Anne in 1988
- named "Canadian Skiers of Distinction" by Ski Canada magazine
- The Twinski Club was inducted into the Laurentian Ski Museum's Hall of Fame in 2005
- Rhoda and Rhona were the Honoured Alumnae at the Trafalgar School for Girls, Montreal, in 2009
- They carried the torch during the Olympic Torch Relay in the Oakville, Ontario area in 2009
- On November 19, 2012 the twins were inducted into the Panthéon des sports du Québec.
- Alain M. Bergeron, popular Quebec children's author chose to adapt their story for a children's book: Les Merveilleuses Jumelles "W", 2012 Québec Amérique; now translated into English: The Amazing Twins "W", Twinski Publications.
- Order of Sport recipients and inducted into Canada's Sports Hall of Fame in 2015.
