= Purgatory (drama) =

1938 drama by William Butler Yeats

- Written by: William Butler Yeats
- Genre: Drama

Premiere
- Place premiered: Abbey Theatre, Dublin, Ireland

Purgatory is a drama by the Irish writer William Butler Yeats. It was first presented in at the Abbey Theatre, Dublin, on 19 August 1938, a few months before Yeats' death.

== Story ==
It tells a family saga of decline and fall, through its two remaining members: an Old Man (the father) and a Boy (his sixteen-year-old son). It is set outside the former family home, which the Old Man's father had drunkenly burned down, causing him to kill his father as the building perished. The Boy is skeptical about tales of his family's former grandeur and is repelled by the Old Man's story of losing his own mother as she gave birth to him, and the decline subsequent events wrought on the family. Tonight, the Old Man tells the Boy, is the anniversary of his mother's wedding night. This was the night on which he was conceived after a bout of drunken carousing by his father, and thus when his mother's fate was sealed. At this point a ghostly figure appears illuminated in a window of the wrecked house. In an attempt to wrest his mother's soul from purgatory, he suddenly stabs and kills the Boy. However, it appears to be in vain: approaching hoof beats of his ghostly father returning to the bridal bed signal that no spirits have left the place, and the grim cycle begins again...

== Background ==
Yeats had been strongly influenced by Japanese Noh theatre in the later years of his life (via Ezra Pound), and Yeats' use of the spirits of the Old Man's parents as a metaphor for the family's decline and of death and rebirth is Noh's clearest influence on the drama. Similarly, the sparseness of the setting, the use of only two characters and the play's relative brevity (conventionally lasting well under an hour) are more immediate influences. However, the story itself affected Yeats even more profoundly. As he wrote Purgatory, he admitted in a letter that the scenario troubled him:

I have a one-act play in my head, a scene of tragic intensity... I am so afraid of that dream. My recent work has greater strangeness, and I think greater intensity than anything I have done. I never remember the dream so deep.

== Critical reception ==
Purgatory received (and continues to receive) mixed responses. Several critics noted the discomforting implications of reading, as Yeats himself suggested, the Old Man's murder of the Boy as an exercise in eugenics and as such perceive the conclusion as somewhat tendentious. T. S. Eliot took a similar line, attacking the play's title from a Christian perspective, arguing that murder does not sit with any notion of purgation.

== Operas ==
=== Gordon Crosse ===
The English composer Gordon Crosse set Yeats' drama as a one-act opera. Premièred at the 1966 Cheltenham International Festival, it includes virtually all of Yeats' original text. It also retains the minimalism of the play, and the spiritual element, but Crosse avoids using Japanese musical motifs associated with Noh, unlike Benjamin Britten, whose contemporaneous parables beginning with Curlew River are more obviously musically inspired by Noh. Two additional operatic settings include one by Hugo Weisgall written in 1958, and Mark Lanz Weiser's setting (1990) premièring at the Peabody Institute in Baltimore in 1991.

=== Ed Di Lello ===
Ed Di Lello composed, orchestrated, conducted and staged Purgatory as an opera on a double bill with Yeats' The Cat and the Moon produced by Philip Meister and Maurice Edwards at The Cubiculo in New York City in March 1974. An unreleased recording of Purgatory is found in the Billy Rose Collection of the New York Public Library. A television version of Purgatory was featured on University Broadcast Lab on WNYC-TV in 1974.
