= Dancemaker =

1998 film

- Film poster
- Directed by: Matthew Diamond
- Produced by: Jack Gulick; Jerry Kupfer; Walter Scheuer
- Cinematography: Tom Hurwitz
- Edited by: Pam Wise
- Production company: Four Oaks Foundation
- Distributed by: Artistic License Films
- Release date: 1998
- Running time: 98 minutes
- Country: United States
- Language: English

Dancemaker is a 1998 American documentary film directed by Matthew Diamond about the career of choreographer Paul Taylor. It was nominated for an Academy Award for Best Documentary Feature. Walter Scheuer, one of the producers, was a longtime trustee of the Paul Taylor Dance Company. After its theatrical run, it aired on the PBS series American Masters.
