= Paul Taylor (choreographer) =

American choreographer (1930–2018)

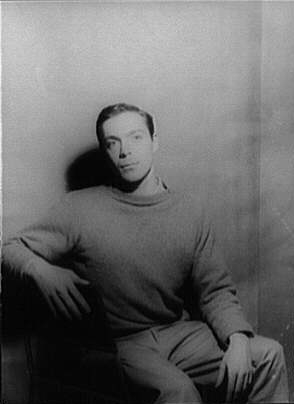
- Taylor in 1960, photo by Carl Van Vechten
- Born: July 29, 1930; Wilkinsburg, Pennsylvania, U.S.
- Died: August 29, 2018 (aged 88); Manhattan, New York, U.S.
- Education: Juilliard School (B.S. 1953)
- Occupation: choreographer
- Years active: 1954–2018

Paul Belville Taylor Jr. (July 29, 1930 – August 29, 2018) was an American dancer and choreographer. He was one of the last living members of the third generation of America's modern dance artists. He founded the Paul Taylor Dance Company in 1954 in New York City.

== Early life and education ==
Taylor was born in Wilkinsburg, Pennsylvania, to Paul Belville Taylor Sr., a physicist, and to the former Elizabeth Rust Pendleton. He grew up in and around Washington, DC. By his teens, he had grown to more than six feet in height. Taylor attended Virginia Episcopal School. He was a student of painting and swam and competed on the swim team, for which he was the recipient of a swimming scholarship, at Syracuse University in the late 1940s. Upon discovering dance through books at the school library, Taylor created his first piece of choreography on Syracuse University Dance department students, which was entitled Hobo Ballet. Taylor then transferred to Juilliard, where he earned a B.S. degree in dance in 1953 under director Martha Hill. It is Taylor's dedication to swimming and other widely varied experiences that has been said to have taught him the commitment imperative to a successful dance career and allowed him to develop his unique and diverse dance aesthetic.

== Career ==
In 1954 Taylor assembled a small company of dancers and began making his own works. A commanding performer despite his late start, he joined the Martha Graham Dance Company in 1955 for the first of seven seasons as soloist where he created the role of the evil Aegisthus in Graham's Clytemnestra, as well as other roles including in Acrobats of God and Alcestis, Visionary Recital, One More Gaudy Night, and Phaedra. All the while he was continuing to choreograph on his own small troupe. He also worked with the choreographers Doris Humphrey, Charles Weidman, José Limón and Jerome Robbins. In 1959 he was invited by George Balanchine to be a guest artist with New York City Ballet, performing his Episodes.

Taylor's early choreographic projects have been noted as distinctly different from the modern, physical works he would come to be known for later, and have even invited comparison to the conceptual performances of the Judson Dance Theatre in the 1960s. Taylor worked closely with painter Robert Rauschenberg who is said to have created the paintings that inspired Taylor's choreography for several pieces including Three Epitaphs and Seven New Dances. Specifically, Rauschenberg's series of “white” paintings resulted in John Cage’s composition, 4’33”, for which Taylor’s piece Duet (1957), was inspired. Duet was part of Taylor’s Seven New Dances concert which became Taylor’s first claim to fame due to this piece that was deemed controversial. During Duet, Taylor and dancer Toby Glanternik remained completely motionless as the pianist played Cage's "non score". On the same program was a work called Epic, in which Taylor moved slowly across the stage in a business suit while a recorded time announcement played in the background. The Dance Observer critic Louis Horst published a blank column that stated only the location and date of Taylor’s performance as a review in November 1957 as a response to Duet, after which Martha Graham called him a "naughty boy."

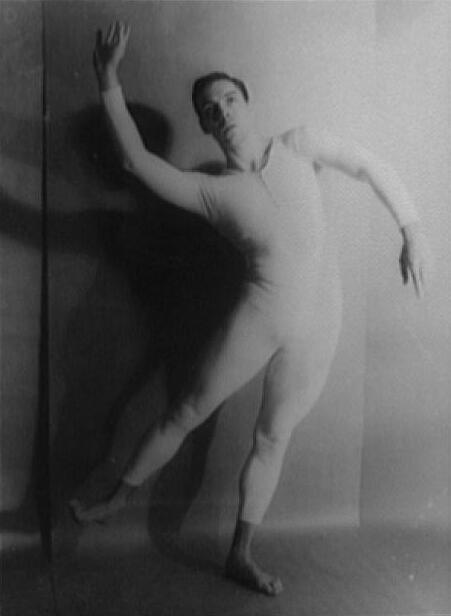
Paul Taylor (1960)

After the debut of Taylor’s Seven New Dances, Taylor continued choreographing new works which led to the completion of two European tours and ten new dances, all while still dancing with the Graham company. The turning point in Taylor’s choreographic career came with the premier of his plotless work Aureole (1962), at the 1962 American Dance Festival, the success of which convinced him to finally leave the Graham company to pursue choreographic work with his group of dancers full time. With Aureole, he departed from such an avant-garde aesthetic. The performance was still intended to provoke dance critics, as he cheekily set his modern movements not to contemporary music but to a baroque score. A choreographer as concerned with subject matter as he was with form, many of Taylor's pieces and movements are pointedly about something. Some movements relate to his fascination with insects and the way they move. Other movements are influenced by his love of swimming. While he may propel his dancers through space for the sheer beauty of it, he has frequently used them to illuminate such profound issues as war, piety, spirituality, sexuality, morality and mortality. He is perhaps best known for his 1975 dance, Esplanade. In Esplanade Taylor was fascinated with the everyday movement that people enacted on a daily basis—from running to sliding, to walking, jumping and falling. The five-section work is set to movements from two of J.S. Bach's violin concertos. Taylor’s fascination with pedestrian movement continued through and beyond Esplanade as he was obsessed with the differences in different dancers’ bodies, or how a simple change in timing, position, or facing, can transform the gesture of everyday movement into dance. For example, Taylor highlighted the nuances in performances of different dancers in his piece Polaris (1976), where the dance featured two sections with identical choreography but two completely different casts.

Another well-known work of his is Private Domain (1969). Taylor was intrigued by the idea of perspective and the relationship of reality and appearance. In Private Domain, Taylor commissioned a set by renowned visual artist Alex Katz, whose rectangular panels obstructed the audience from seeing a portion of the stage depending on their vantage points. The seen and unseen relationship that the audience experienced was well received. In another work, Lost, Found, and Lost (1982) Taylor again showed his interest in pedestrian movement. In one section, dancers move one by one into the wing as they are waiting on a slow-moving line.

Taylor choreographed his own version of The Rite of Spring in 1980 that he named Le Sacre du Printemps (The Rehearsal). Accompanied by a two-piano version of the original Stravinsky score, The Rehearsal is a detective story complete with gangsters and kidnappings, but Taylor balanced his version with an ode to the original. In one scene a grieving mother echoes the Chosen Maiden from Nijinsky's version. This balance of old and new was widely praised, in addition to the challenging technical demands of the movement.

Other well-known and highly regarded or controversial Taylor works include Big Bertha (1970), Airs (1978), Arden Court (1981), Sunset (1983), Last Look (1985), Speaking in Tongues (1988), Brandenburgs (1988), Company B (1991), Piazzolla Caldera (1997), Black Tuesday (2001), Promethean Fire (2002), and Beloved Renegade (2008). Some of these dances, performed by the Paul Taylor Dance Company, are also licensed by such companies as the Royal Danish Ballet, Miami City Ballet, American Ballet Theatre and Alvin Ailey American Dance Theater.

Many scholars and dance critics have established a categorization of Taylor's works and identified patterns surrounding his choreographic development. Following Taylor's first major success Aureole (1962), Taylor's next commission for the American Dance Festival was Scudorama (1963), which provided a stark contrast to Taylor's previous work. This prompted scholars to identify a light/dark pattern in Taylor's choreography due to Scudorama’s apparent representation of evil in comparison to Aureole’s lyrical, sunny nature. This categorization that arose due to the uncommon versatility of Taylor’s choreography continued with critics placing Taylor works Airs (1978), Esplanade (1975), Arden Court (1981), and Mercuric Tidings (1982) in the “light” category, and Big Bertha (1970), Last Look (1985), and Speaking in Tongues (1988) in the “dark” category. Some scholars have argued that Taylor's works cannot be confined to two distinct categories though as he has also created humorous and witty, romantic, and movement centered works with the pieces Piece Period (1962), Roses (1985), and Images (1977) respectively, while also in some cases diverging from his typical plotlessness and creating story centric pieces such as Snow White (1983).

Taylor collaborated with artists such as Robert Rauschenberg, Jasper Johns, Ellsworth Kelly, Alex Katz, Tharon Musser, Thomas Skelton, Gene Moore, John Rawlings, William Ivey Long, Jennifer Tipton, Santo Loquasto, James F. Ingalls, Donald York and Matthew Diamond. His career and creative process has been much discussed, as he is the subject of the Oscar-nominated documentary Dancemaker, and author of the autobiography Private Domain and a Wall Street Journal essay, "Why I Make Dances."

== Recognition ==
Taylor was a recipient of the Kennedy Center Honors in 1992 and received an Emmy Award for Speaking in Tongues, produced by WNET/New York the previous year. In 1993 he was awarded the National Medal of Arts by United States President Bill Clinton. He received the Algur H. Meadows Award for Excellence in the Arts in 1995 and was named one of 50 prominent Americans honored in recognition of their outstanding achievement by the Library of Congress's Office of Scholarly Programs. He is the recipient of three Guggenheim Fellowships and honorary Doctor of Fine Arts degrees from California Institute of the Arts, Connecticut College, Duke University, The Juilliard School, Skidmore College, the State University of New York at Purchase, Syracuse University and Adelphi University. Taylor's Awards for lifetime achievement include a MacArthur Foundation Fellowship – often called the "genius award" – and the Samuel H. Scripps American Dance Festival Award. Other awards include the New York State Governor's Arts Award and the New York City Mayor's Award of Honor for Art and Culture. In 1989 Taylor was elected one of ten honorary American members of the American Academy and Institute of Arts and Letters.

Having been elected to knighthood by the French government as Chevalier de l'Ordre des Arts et des Lettres in 1969 and elevated to Officier in 1984 and Commandeur in 1990, Taylor was awarded France's highest honor, the Légion d'Honneur, for exceptional contributions to French culture, in 2000.

Private Domain, originally published by Alfred A. Knopf and re-released by North Point Press and later by the University of Pittsburgh Press, was nominated by the National Book Critics Circle as the most distinguished biography of 1987. Dancemaker, Matthew Diamond's award-winning feature-length film about Taylor, was hailed by Time as "perhaps the best dance documentary ever." Taylor's Facts and Fancies: Essays Written Mostly for Fun, was published by Delphinium in 2013.

The 2019 American Dance Festival's season, its 86th, was dedicated to Paul Taylor.

== Paul Taylor Dance Company ==
The choreographer's works, totaling 147, are performed by the 16-member Paul Taylor Dance Company and dance companies throughout the world.

Of his works, 50 are documented in Labanotation. In each completed score there is a section "Introductory Material," which includes topics such as: Casts, Stylistic Notes, as well as other Production information.

In 1992, the Paul Taylor Dance Company in conjunction with the National Endowment for the Arts launched the Repertory Preservation Project which was centered around the documentation of thirty of Taylor's dances, including lost works such as from Seven New Dances. This was made possible with the grant of $850,000 that was awarded to Taylor's company, and the project led to the birth of the company Taylor 2, a junior company to the main Paul Taylor Dance Company, which allowed these dancers to preserve Taylor's works through performance.

A 2015 documentary titled Paul Taylor: Creative Domain showcased his creative process. It was described as "a fly-on-the-wall depiction of the 2010 creation of Three Dubious Memories, his 133rd modern-dance piece for the eponymous company that he founded over 60 years ago."

== Paul Taylor American Modern Dance ==
In 2015, Taylor began a new program, called Paul Taylor American Modern Dance, in which works of modern dance by choreographers other than Taylor—performed by dancers practiced in those styles—are included in the company's annual season at the Koch Theater at Lincoln Center. In addition, contemporary choreographers receive commissions to create new works on the Taylor company. Thus far, dances by Doris Humphrey, Shen Wei, Merce Cunningham, Martha Graham, Donald McKayle, and Trisha Brown have been presented. New commissions by Doug Elkins, Larry Keigwin, Lila York, Bryan Arias, Doug Varone, Margie Gillis, Pam Tanowitz, and Kyle Abraham have been set on and danced by Paul Taylor Dance Company. Since 2015, live music has been performed on every program by the Orchestra of St. Luke's.

== Death ==
Taylor died of renal failure on August 29, 2018, at a Manhattan hospital at the age of 88.

== Selected works ==
- Circus Polka (1955)
- 3 Epitaphs (1956)
- Seven New Dances (1957)
- Rebus (1958)
- Tablet (1960)
- Fibers (1961)
- Junction (1961)
- Aureole (1962)
- La Negra (1963)
- Scudorama (1963)
- Party Mix (1963)
- The Red Room (1964)
- Duet (1964)
- Post Meridian (1965)
- Orbs (1966)
- Lento (1967)
- Public Domain (1968)
- Private Domain (1969)
- Churchyard (1969)
- Big Bertha (1970)
- Fetes (1971)
- So Long Eden (1972)
- Noah's Minstrels (1973)
- American Genesis (1973)
- Sports and Follies (1974)
- Esplanade (1975)
- Runes (1975)
- Cloven Kingdom (1976)
- Polaris (1976)
- Images (1977)
- Dust (1977)
- Airs (1978)
- Nightshade (1979)
- Profiles (1979)
- Le Sacre Du Printemps (1980)
- Arden Court (1981)
- House of Cards (1981)
- Mercuric Tidings (1982)
- Sunset (1983)
- Equinox (1983)
- Roses (1985)
- Musical Offering (1986)
- Counterswarm (1988)
- Brandenburgs (1988)
- Danbury Mix (1988)
- The Sorcerer's Sofa (1989)
- Fact & Fancy (1991)
- Company B (199
- Spindrift (1993)
- Prim Numbers (1997)
- Eventide (1997)
- Piazzola Caldera (1997)
- The Word (1998)
- Oh, You Kid! (1999)
- Cascade (1999)
- Dandelion Wine (2000)
- Black Tuesday (2001)
- Antique Valentine (2001)
- In The Beginning (2003)
- Le Grand Puppetier (2004)
- Spring Rounds (2004)
- Troilus and Cressida (2006)
- Lines Of Loss (2007)
- De Suenos Que Se Repiten (2007)
- Changes (2008)
- Also Playing (2009)
- Three Dubious Memories (2010)
- The Uncommitted (2011)
- To Make Crops Grow (2012)
- Perpetual Dawn (2013)
- Sea Lark (2014)
- Death and the Damsel (2015)

== See also ==
- Modern dance
- Postmodern dance
- 20th century concert dance
- List of dance companies
- Dancemaker
