= Christopher Gillis =

Canadian dancer, choreographer (1951–1993)

Christopher Gillis (February 26, 1951–August 7, 1993) was an important Canadian male dancer and choreographer and member of the Paul Taylor Dance Company in New York City.

== Early life and career ==
Christopher Gillis was born on February 26, 1951, in Montreal, Quebec. He was the son of Gene Gillis, a US Olympic skier, and Rhona Wurtele, a Canadian Olympic skier who competed in the 1948 Winter Olympics along with her twin sister Rhoda. His sister, Margie Gillis, is also a dancer and choreographer; they were dance partners from childhood and collaborated on numerous shows. His brother, Jere Gillis, played professional hockey from 1977 to 1987 for the Vancouver Canucks, New York Rangers, Quebec Nordiques, Buffalo Sabres, and the Philadelphia Flyers.

Gillis studied with Finis Jhung, with Paul Taylor and with choreographers May O'Donnell and Norman Walker. He performed with José Limón's company.

He joined the Paul Taylor Dance Company in 1976 in New York City. He lived and worked in New York for the next seventeen years. He was designated Taylor's heir-apparent.

His works have been performed by the Paul Taylor company, the White Oak Dance Project and the Fairfax Ballet.

He died on August 7, 1993 in New York City, from AIDS complications at the age of 42.

== Works ==
=== As choreographer ===
- Ne Me Quitte Pas 1993
- Landscape 1993
- Ghost Stories (around 1985?)
- Andalusian Green 1992
- Icarus At Night 1991
- Curbs & Corridors 1990
- Luvs Alphabet 1989
- Spell It Out 1988
- Paean 1987
- VeRS La Glace 1986
- Thin Ice 1982

=== As dancer ===
- Fact and Fancy 3 Epitaphs & All / choreographed by Paul Taylor 1991
- Of Bright & Blue Birds & the Gala Sun 1990
- The Sorcerer's Sofa / choreographed by Paul Taylor 1989
- Minikin Fair / choreographed by Paul Taylor 1989
- Speaking in Tongues / choreographed by Paul Taylor 1988
- Danbury Mix / choreographed by Paul Taylor 1988
- Counterswarm / choreographed by Paul Taylor 1988
- Brandenburgs / choreographed by Paul Taylor 1988
- Syzygy / choreographed by Paul Taylor 1987
- Kith and Kin / choreographed by Paul Taylor 1987
- A Musical Offering / choreographed by Paul Taylor 1986
- Ab Ovo Usque Ad Mala (From Soup to Nuts) / choreographed by Paul Taylor 1986
- Roses / choreographed by Paul Taylor 1985
- Byzantium / choreographed by Paul Taylor 1984
- Equinox / choreographed by Paul Taylor 1983
- Snow White / choreographed by Paul Taylor 1983
- Sunset / choreographed by Paul Taylor 1983
- Mecuric Tidings / choreographed by Paul Taylor 1982
- Lost, Found and Lost / choreographed by Paul Taylor 1981
- House of Cards / choreographed by Paul Taylor 1981
- Arden Court / choreographed by Paul Taylor 1981
- Le Sacre du Printemps (the Rehearsal) / choreographed by Paul Taylor 1980
- Profiles / choreographed by Paul Taylor 1979
- Nightshade / choreographed by Paul Taylor 1979
- Diggity / choreographed by Paul Taylor 1978
- Airs / choreographed by Paul Taylor 1978
- Aphrodisiamania / choreographed by Paul Taylor 1977
- Dust / choreographed by Paul Taylor) 1977
- Images / choreographed by Paul Taylor) 1977
- Polaris / choreographed by Paul Taylor) 1976
- Cloven Kingdom / choreographed by Paul Taylor) 1976

=== Film ===
- Eye on Dance, Produced by: Celia Ipiotis. Documentary/Interview with Margie and Christopher Gillis, ARC Videodance NY 1990
