= Doug Varone =

American choreographer and director

Doug Varone (born 1955/1956) is an American choreographer and director. He works in dance, theater, opera, film and fashion. He is an educator and advocate for dance. His company, Doug Varone and Dancers, has been performing for over three decades.

== Education ==
Varone received his BFA from Purchase College, where he was awarded the President’s Distinguished Alumni Award in 2007.

== Choreography ==
Varone created many works for the concert dance stage. His commissions include works for the Paul Taylor Dance Company, the Limón Company, the Hubbard Street Dance Chicago, the Rambert Dance Company (London), the Martha Graham Dance Company, the Dancemakers (Canada), the Batsheva Dance Company (Israel), the Bern Ballet (Switzerland) and An Creative (Japan). Varone's dances have been staged by more than 75 college and university programs.

In opera, Varone has served as a director and choreographer. Among his four productions for The Metropolitan Opera are Salome (with its Dance of the Seven Veils for Karita Mattila), the world premiere of Tobias Picker’s An American Tragedy and Stravinsky’s Le Sacre du Printemps, designed by David Hockney. His MET Opera production of Hector Berloiz’s Les Troyens was broadcast worldwide in HD. Varone staged multiple premieres and new productions for the Minnesota Opera, the Opera Colorado, the Washington Opera, the New York City Opera and the Boston Lyric Opera, among others. His theater credits include choreography for Broadway, Off-Broadway and regional theaters. His choreography for the musical Murder Ballad at the Manhattan Theater Club earned him a Lortel Award nomination. Varone's film credits include choreography for the Patrick Swayze film One Last Dance. In 2008, Varone’s Bottomland, set in the Mammoth Caves of Kentucky, was the subject of the PBS broadcast Dance in America: Wolf Trap’s Face of America.

== Teaching ==
As an educator, Varone holds workshops and master classes worldwide for dancers, musicians and actors. He is on the faculty at Purchase College, teaching composition and choreography.

== Recognition ==
Varone's honors and awards include:

- John Simon Guggenheim Fellowship
- OBIE Award (for the direction/choreography of Lincoln Center’s Orpheus and Euridice)
- Jerome Robbins Fellowship at the Boglaisco Institute in Italy
- Two individual Bessie Awards
- Two American Dance Festival Doris Duke Awards for New Work
- Four National Dance Project Awards.
