= The Handmaid's Tale =

1985 novel by Margaret Atwood

- Cover of the first edition
- Author: Margaret Atwood
- Cover artist: Tad Aronowicz, design; Gail Geltner, collage (first edition, hardback)
- Language: English
- Genre: Dystopian novel Speculative fiction Tragedy
- Publisher: McClelland and Stewart, Houghton Mifflin Harcourt (ebook)
- Publication date: April 17, 1985
- Publication place: Canada
- Media type: Print (Hardcover and Paperback)
- Pages: 311
- ISBN: 0-7710-0813-9
- OCLC: 12825460
- Dewey Decimal: 819.1354
- LC Class: PR9199.A8 H3618
- Followed by: The Testaments

The Handmaid's Tale is a futuristic dystopian novel by Canadian author Margaret Atwood published in 1985. It is set in a near-future New England in a patriarchal, totalitarian theonomic state known as the Republic of Gilead, which has overthrown the United States government. The protagonist, a woman named Offred, occupies the role of a "Handmaid": women who are forcibly assigned to bear children for high status men.

The novel explores themes of powerless women in a patriarchal society, suppression of reproductive rights, and the various means by which women resist and try to gain individuality and independence. The title echoes the component parts of Geoffrey Chaucer's The Canterbury Tales, which is a series of connected stories (such as "The Merchant's Tale" and "The Parson's Tale"). It also alludes to the tradition of fairy tales where the central character tells her story.

The Handmaid's Tale won the 1985 Governor General's Award and the first Arthur C. Clarke Award in 1987; it was also nominated for the 1986 Nebula Award, the 1986 Booker Prize, and the 1987 Prometheus Award. In 2022, The Handmaid's Tale was included on the "Big Jubilee Read" list of 70 books by Commonwealth authors, selected to celebrate the Platinum Jubilee of Elizabeth II. The book has been adapted into a 1990 film, a 2000 opera, a 2017 television series, and other media. A sequel novel, The Testaments, was published in 2019.

== Plot ==
In the near future, the Sons of Jacob, a radical political group inspired by the Old Testament, assassinate the president of the United States and most of Congress, and reform the United States into a theonomic military dictatorship known as the Republic of Gilead. The ruling class of Gilead, known as Commanders, severely limit women's rights. Women are denied the right to read and own property, and are deprived of reproductive rights. Women's ranks are indicated by the colour and design of their clothing: the Commanders' Wives are clad in blue, their unmarried daughters in white, the Handmaids in red with white bonnets, the Aunts (who train and indoctrinate the Handmaids) in brown, the Marthas (cooks and maids) in green, and the Econowives (the wives of lower-ranking men) in blue, red and green stripes.

During the revolution, a woman is caught while attempting to reach Canada with her husband and five-year-old daughter. Because her husband was formerly married, she is considered an adulterer by Gilead's draconian criminal justice system and her daughter is taken from her. She is forced to become a Handmaid, a role based on the biblical story of Rachel and her handmaid Bilhah, and assigned to produce children for the Commanders. Her name, Offred, is a patronymic constructed of "of" and the first name of the head of her household; Handmaids' names change as they change households.

Offred describes her life. Interspersed between the narrative of her present-day experiences are flashbacks of her life before and during the revolution, including her failed escape, indoctrination by the Aunts, and her friend Moira's escape from the indoctrination facility. At her new home, she is treated poorly by the Commander's wife, Serena Joy, a former Christian media personality who supported women's domesticity and subordinate role well before Gilead was established. Offred is subjected monthly to the "Ceremony", a ritualized rape by the Commander conducted during a Handmaid's likely fertile period, with the wife present, intended to result in conception.

To Offred's surprise, the Commander illegally arranges meetings with her alone in his library. He plies her with games of Scrabble, and offers her information and material items in return. Finally, he gives her lingerie and takes her to a covert, government-run brothel, where she unexpectedly encounters Moira. In the days between her visits to the Commander, Offred also learns her shopping partner, a woman called Ofglen, is with Mayday, an underground resistance network working to overthrow Gilead's government.

Serena begins to suspect that her husband is infertile, so she arranges for Offred to have sex with Nick, the Commander's personal driver. Serena provides Offred with information about her daughter in exchange, and brings her a photograph. After their initial sexual encounter, Offred and Nick begin to meet on their own initiative; eventually, Offred tells Nick that she thinks she is pregnant.

Serena finds evidence of Offred's illegal relationship with the Commander. Shortly afterward, the secret police arrive to take Offred away. As she is led to a waiting van, Nick tells her to trust him and go with the men. Offred is unsure if Nick or the men are Eyes (the secret police force) or members of Mayday, or if they are here to capture her or aid in her escape; she ultimately enters the van. Her future remains uncertain, while Serena and the Commander are left bereft in their house, each contemplating the repercussions of Offred's capture on their lives.

The novel concludes with a metafictional epilogue: a partial transcript of an international historical association conference taking place in 2195. The male keynote speaker explains that Offred's narrative was initially recorded on a set of audio cassettes, and later transcribed by historians. The speaker comments on the difficulty of authenticating the account, due to how few records have survived from the early years of Gilead's existence, and speculates on the eventual fates of Offred and her acquaintances.

== Composition background ==
Atwood described The Handmaid's Tale is a work of speculative fiction rather than science fiction. The novel offers a satirical view of various social, political, and religious trends of early Puritanism in the United States, which she studied while attending Harvard on a Woodrow Wilson Fellowship. Rejecting the notion that Puritans came to America to flee religious persecution in England by establishing a religiously tolerant society, Atwood argues that Puritan leaders wanted to establish a monolithic theonomy where religious dissent would not be tolerated. Atwood maintains that "nations never build apparently radical forms of government on foundations that aren't there already," and further describes the novel's setting as a potential process for how someone might seize power in the United States. Such a situation, argues Atwood, would "need only the opportunity of a period of social chaos to reassert itself."

Atwood argues that all of the scenarios offered in The Handmaid's Tale have actually occurred in real life — in an interview she gave regarding her later novel Oryx and Crake, she said that "As with The Handmaid's Tale, I didn't put in anything that we haven't already done, we're not already doing, we're seriously trying to do, coupled with trends that are already in progress [...] So all of those things are real, and therefore the amount of pure invention is close to nil." She was known to carry around newspaper clippings to her various interviews to support her fiction's basis in reality, and has said that The Handmaid's Tale is a response to those who say the oppressive, totalitarian, and religious governments that have taken hold in other countries throughout the years "can't happen here".

Atwood was inspired by the Islamic revolution in Iran in 1978–79 that saw a theocracy established that drastically reduced the rights of women and imposed a strict dress code on Iranian women, very much like that of Gilead. In The Handmaid's Tale, a reference is made to the Islamic Republic of Iran in the form of the history book Iran and Gilead: Two Late Twentieth Century Monotheocracies mentioned in the endnotes describing the historians' convention in 2195. Atwood's picture of a society ruled by men who professed high moral principles despite selfish motives was inspired by her observations of Canadian politicians, especially those of her hometown Toronto, who she argues frequently profess their actions to be founded in moral principles.

During World War II, Canadian women took on jobs in the place of men serving in the military that they were expected to yield to men once the war was over. After 1945, not all women wanted to return to their traditional roles as housewives and mothers, leading to a male backlash. Atwood was born in 1939, and while growing up in the 1950s she saw first-hand the complaints against women who continued to work after 1945 and of women who unhappily gave up their jobs, which she incorporated into her novel. The way in which the narrator is forced into becoming an unhappy housewife after she loses her job, in common with all the other women of Gilead, was inspired by Atwood's memories of the 1950s.

Atwood dedicated the novel to her own ancestor Mary Webster, who was accused of witchcraft in Puritan New England but survived her hanging. Due to the totalitarian nature of Gileadean society, Atwood, in creating the setting, drew from the "utopian idealism" present in 20th-century regimes, such as Khmer Rouge Cambodia and Communist era Romania, as well as earlier New England Puritanism. Atwood has argued that a coup, such as the one depicted in The Handmaid's Tale, would misuse religion in order to achieve its own ends.

Atwood, in regards to those leading Gilead, further stated:

I don't consider these people to be Christians because they do not have at the core of their behaviour and ideologies what I, in my feeble Canadian way, would consider to be the core of Christianity ... and that would be not only love your neighbours but love your enemies. That would also be "I was sick and you visited me not" and such and such ...And that would include also concern for the environment, because you can't love your neighbour or even your enemy, unless you love your neighbour's oxygen, food, and water. You can't love your neighbour or your enemy if you're presuming policies that are going to cause those people to die. ... Of course faith can be a force for good and often has been. So faith is a force for good particularly when people are feeling beleaguered and in need of hope. So you can have bad iterations and you can also have the iteration in which people have got too much power and then start abusing it. But that is human behaviour, so you can't lay it down to religion. You can find the same in any power situation, such as politics or ideologies that purport to be atheist. Need I mention the former Soviet Union? So it is not a question of religion making people behave badly. It is a question of human beings getting power and then wanting more of it.

In the same vein, Atwood also declared that "in the real world today, some religious groups are leading movements for the protection of vulnerable groups, including women." Atwood draws connections between the ways in which Gilead's leaders maintain their power and other examples of actual totalitarian governments. In her interviews, Atwood cites the Islamic Emirate of Afghanistan as an example of a totalitarian religious theocracy forcing women out of the public sphere and into their homes, as in Gilead.

Gilead's "state-sanctioned murder of dissidents" was inspired by the Philippines under President Ferdinand Marcos, and the last General Secretary of the Romanian Communist Party Nicolae Ceaușescu's obsession with increasing the birth rate (Decree 770) led to the strict policing of pregnant women and the outlawing of birth control and abortion. However, Atwood argues that many of these actions were present not just in other cultures and countries, "but within Western society, and within the 'Christian' tradition itself".

The Republic of Gilead struggles with infertility, making Offred's services as a Handmaid vital to producing children and thus reproducing the society. Handmaids themselves are "untouchable", but their ability to signify status is equated to that of slaves or servants throughout history. Atwood connects their concerns with infertility to real-life problems our world faces, such as radiation, chemical pollution, and sexually transmitted disease (HIV/AIDS is specifically mentioned in the "Historical Notes" section at the end of the novel). Atwood's strong stance on environmental issues and their negative consequences for our society has presented itself in other works such as her MaddAddam trilogy, and refers back to her growing up with biologists and her own scientific curiosity.

Atwood has described writing The Handmaid's Tale in an array of locations. In a 2018 article for LitHub, she recalls that she started the manuscript in spring 1984 while living in West Berlin, returned to Canada in June 1984, writing there through the fall, and then finished the book in Tuscaloosa, Alabama, where she held an MFA chair in the University of Alabama's English department for 1985's spring semester. The copyright page of the novel contains the line "The author would like to thank the D.A.A.D in West Berlin and the English department at the University of Alabama, Tuscaloosa, for providing time and space." Atwood has said that the first person to read the manuscript was her friend and fellow novelist Valerie Martin, who was also teaching at Alabama. Atwood's memory is that Martin offered some mild praise along the lines of "I think you've got something here," while Martin remembers her immediate reaction was more like, "you're about to be rich!"

== Characters ==
=== Offred ===
Offred is the protagonist and narrator. She is referred to by a slave name that describes her function: she is "of Fred". Offred says that she is not a concubine, but a tool; a "two-legged womb". "Offred" is also a pun on the word "offered", as in "offered as a sacrifice", and "of red" because of the red dress assigned for the Handmaids in Gilead.

She was labelled a "wanton woman" when Gilead was established because she had married a man who was divorced. All divorces were nullified by the new government, meaning her husband was now considered still married to his first wife, making Offred an adulteress. In trying to escape Gilead, she was separated from her husband and daughter. Proved fertile, she is considered an important commodity and has been placed as a "Handmaid" in the home of "the Commander" and his wife Serena Joy, to bear a child for them.

Offred does not characterize the Ceremony as rape on the basis that she agreed to be a Handmaid, despite the implication that she had no choice (the alternative may have been execution or hard labour cleaning nuclear waste). Whether this is a belief she has adapted to lessen her mental strain or the result of brainwashing during her Handmaid training is unclear.

Offred's real name is not revealed in the novel. Some readers have inferred that her real name could be June: in the novel's prologue, the women in training to be Handmaids whisper names across their beds at night—"Alma. Janine. Dolores. Moira. June."—and all later appear as named characters in the novel except for June. In addition, one of the Aunts tells the Handmaids-in-training to stop "mooning and June-ing". Atwood wrote that it was not her original intention to identify Offred with June, "but it fits, so readers are welcome to it if they wish". In Volker Schlöndorff's 1990 film adaptation Offred was given the name Kate, while the 2017 television series names her June outright.

Academic Madonne Miner suggests that "June" is a pseudonym. As "Mayday" is the name of the Gilead resistance, June could be an invention by the protagonist. The Nunavut conference covered in the epilogue takes place in June.

=== The Commander ===
The Commander says that he was a scientist and was previously involved in something similar to market research before Gilead's inception. Later, it is hypothesized that he is one of the architects of Gilead. Presumably, his first name is "Fred", though that, too, may be a pseudonym. He engages in forbidden intellectual pursuits with Offred, such as playing Scrabble, and introduces her to a secret club that serves as a brothel for high-ranking officers.

He shows his softer side to Offred during their covert meetings and confesses to being "misunderstood" by his wife. Offred learns that the Commander carried on a similar relationship with his previous Handmaid, who later killed herself when his wife found out.

In the epilogue, Professor Pieixoto speculates that one of two figures, both instrumental in the establishment of Gilead, may have been the Commander, based on the name "Fred". It is his belief that the Commander was a man named Frederick R. Waterford who was killed in a purge shortly after Offred was taken away, charged with harbouring an enemy agent.

=== Serena Joy ===
Serena Joy is a former televangelist and the Commander's Wife in the fundamentalist theonomy. "Serena Joy", also referred to as "Pam", are likely pseudonyms. In the epilogue, Professor Pieixoto notes that Frederick Waterford's wife, who "once worked as a television personality of the type described" in the novel, was named Thelma. Serena Joy spends her free time gardening and knitting, as those are two of the limited activities allowed to the Wives, who are sequestered to the home and domestic sphere. Offred identifies Serena Joy by recalling seeing her on TV when she was young. Serena Joy was an advocate for Gilead and traditional values in pre-Gilead society. The state took away her power and public recognition. In Gilead, she must leave behind her past as a television figure and act in the position of a Commander's wife.

As she is deemed sterile, Serena Joy is forced to use a Handmaid. Serena Joy arranges for Offred to have sex with Nick in order to become pregnant, hinting that she suspects it is the Commander who is sterile, although the possibility of male sterility is not recognized by the state.

=== Ofglen ===
Ofglen is a neighbor partnered with Offred to do the daily shopping; Handmaids are never alone and are expected to police each other's behavior. Ofglen is a secret member of the Mayday resistance. In contrast to Offred, she is daring. She knocks out a Mayday spy who is to be tortured and killed in order to save him the pain of a violent death. Offred is told that when Ofglen vanishes, it is because she has committed suicide before the government can take her into custody due to her membership in the resistance. A new Handmaid takes Ofglen's place and threatens Offred against any thought of resistance. However, she breaks protocol by telling her what happened to the previous Ofglen.

=== Nick ===
Nick is the Commander's chauffeur, who lives above the garage. Nick is a daring character as he smokes and tries to engage with Offred, both forbidden activities. By Serena Joy's arrangement, he and Offred start a sexual relationship to increase her chance of getting pregnant. If she were unable to bear the Commander a child, she would be declared sterile and shipped to the Colonies. Offred begins to develop feelings for him. Nick is an ambiguous character, and Offred does not know if he is a party loyalist or part of the resistance, though he identifies himself as the latter. The epilogue suggests that he was part of the resistance, and aided Offred in escaping the Commander's house.

=== Moira ===
Moira has been a close friend of Offred's since college. A lesbian, she is subjected to the homophobia of Gileadean society. Moira is taken to be a Handmaid soon after Offred. She finds the life of a Handmaid unbearably oppressive and risks engaging with the guards just to defy the system. She escapes by stealing an Aunt's pass and clothes, but Offred later finds her working as a sex slave in a party-run brothel. She was caught and chose the brothel rather than to be sent to the Colonies.

=== Luke ===
Luke was Offred's husband before the formation of Gilead. He was married when he first started a relationship with Offred and divorced his first wife to marry her. Under Gilead, all divorces were retroactively nullified, resulting in Offred being considered an adulteress and their daughter illegitimate. Offred was forced to become a Handmaid and her daughter was given to a loyalist family. Since their attempt to escape to Canada, Offred has heard nothing of Luke. She wavers between believing him dead or imprisoned.

=== Aunt Lydia ===
Aunt Lydia works at the 'Red Centre' where women receive instructions for a life as a Handmaid. Throughout the narrative, Aunt Lydia's pithy pronouncements on the code of conduct for the Handmaids shed light on the philosophy of subjugation of women practised in Gilead. Aunt Lydia appears to be a true believer of Gilead's religious philosophy and seems to take her job as a genuine calling.

In Atwood's sequel, The Testaments, Aunt Lydia is revealed to have been aiding anti-Gilead resistance networks. Her actions in releasing internal information to selected contacts instigates an internal purge that demolishes Gilead's ability to function and restores the United States. She also writes an autobiography of her life, which she hides in a copy of Cardinal John Henry Newman's Apologia Pro Vita Sua in the restricted section of the Ardua Hall library.

=== Cora ===
Cora is a Martha who works at the Commander's house because she is infertile. She hopes that Offred will get pregnant as she desires to help raise a child. She is friendly towards Offred and covers up for her when she finds her lying on the floor one morning—a suspicious occurrence by Gilead's standards, worthy of being reported.

=== Rita ===
Rita is a Martha at the Commander's house. Her job is cooking and housekeeping and she is one of the members of the household. At the start of the novel, Rita has a contempt for Offred and, though she is responsible for keeping Offred well fed, she believes a Handmaid should prefer going to the Colonies over working as a sexual slave.

== Setting and plot devices ==
The novel is set in an indeterminate dystopian future, speculated to be around the year 2005, with a fundamentalist theonomy ruling the territory of what had been the United States but is now the Republic of Gilead. The fertility rates in Gilead have diminished due to environmental toxicity and fertile women are a valuable commodity owned and enslaved by the powerful elite. Individuals are segregated by categories and dressed according to their social functions. Complex dress codes play a key role in imposing social control within the new society and serve to distinguish people by sex, occupation, and caste.

The action takes place in what once was the Harvard Square neighbourhood of Cambridge, Massachusetts; Atwood studied at Radcliffe College, located in this area. As a researcher, Atwood spent a lot of time in the Widener Library at Harvard which in the novel serves as a setting for the headquarters of the Gilead Secret Service.

=== Religion ===
Bruce Miller, the creator and executive producer of The Handmaid's Tale television serial, argues that Gilead is "a society that's based kind of in a perverse misreading of Old Testament laws and codes". The author explains that Gilead tries to embody the "utopian idealism" present in 20th-century regimes, as well as earlier New England Puritanism. Both Atwood and Miller stated that the people running Gilead are "not genuinely Christian".

The group running Gilead, according to Atwood, is "not really interested in religion; they're interested in power". In her prayers to God, Offred reflects on Gilead and prays "I don't believe for an instant that what's going on out there is what You meant... I suppose I should say I forgive whoever did this, and whatever they're doing now. I'll try, but it isn't easy." Margaret Atwood, writing on this, says that "Offred herself has a private version of the Lord's Prayer and refuses to believe that this regime has been mandated by a just and merciful God."

Christian churches that do not support the actions of the Sons of Jacob are systematically demolished, and the people living in Gilead are never seen attending church. Christian denominations, including Quakers, Baptists, Jehovah's Witnesses, and Roman Catholics, are specifically named as enemies of the Sons of Jacob. Nuns who refuse conversion are considered "unwomen" and banished to the Colonies, owing to their reluctance to marry and refusal (or inability) to bear children. Priests unwilling to convert are executed and hanged from the Wall. Atwood pits Quaker Christians against the regime, commenting: "The Quakers have gone underground, and are running an escape route to Canada, as—I suspect—they would."

Jews are named an exception and classified Sons of Jacob. Offred observes that Jews refusing to convert are allowed to emigrate from Gilead to Israel, and most choose to leave. However, in the epilogue, Professor Pieixoto reveals that many of the emigrating Jews ended up being dumped into the sea while on the ships ostensibly tasked with transporting them to Israel, due to privatization of the "repatriation program" and capitalists' effort to maximize profits. Offred mentions that many Jews who chose to stay were caught secretly practising Judaism and executed.

=== Women ===
Women's roles in Gilead are strictly delineated.

==== Wives and daughters ====
"Wife" is the top social level permitted to women, achieved by marriage to higher-ranking officers (Commanders). Wives always wear blue dresses and cloaks, suggesting traditional depictions of the Virgin Mary in historic Christian art. When a Commander dies, his Wife becomes a Widow and must dress in black until she remarries.

"Daughter" applies to the natural or adopted children of the ruling class. They wear white until marriage, which is arranged by the government. The narrator's daughter may have been adopted by an infertile Wife and Commander, and she is shown in a photograph wearing a long white dress.

==== Handmaids ====
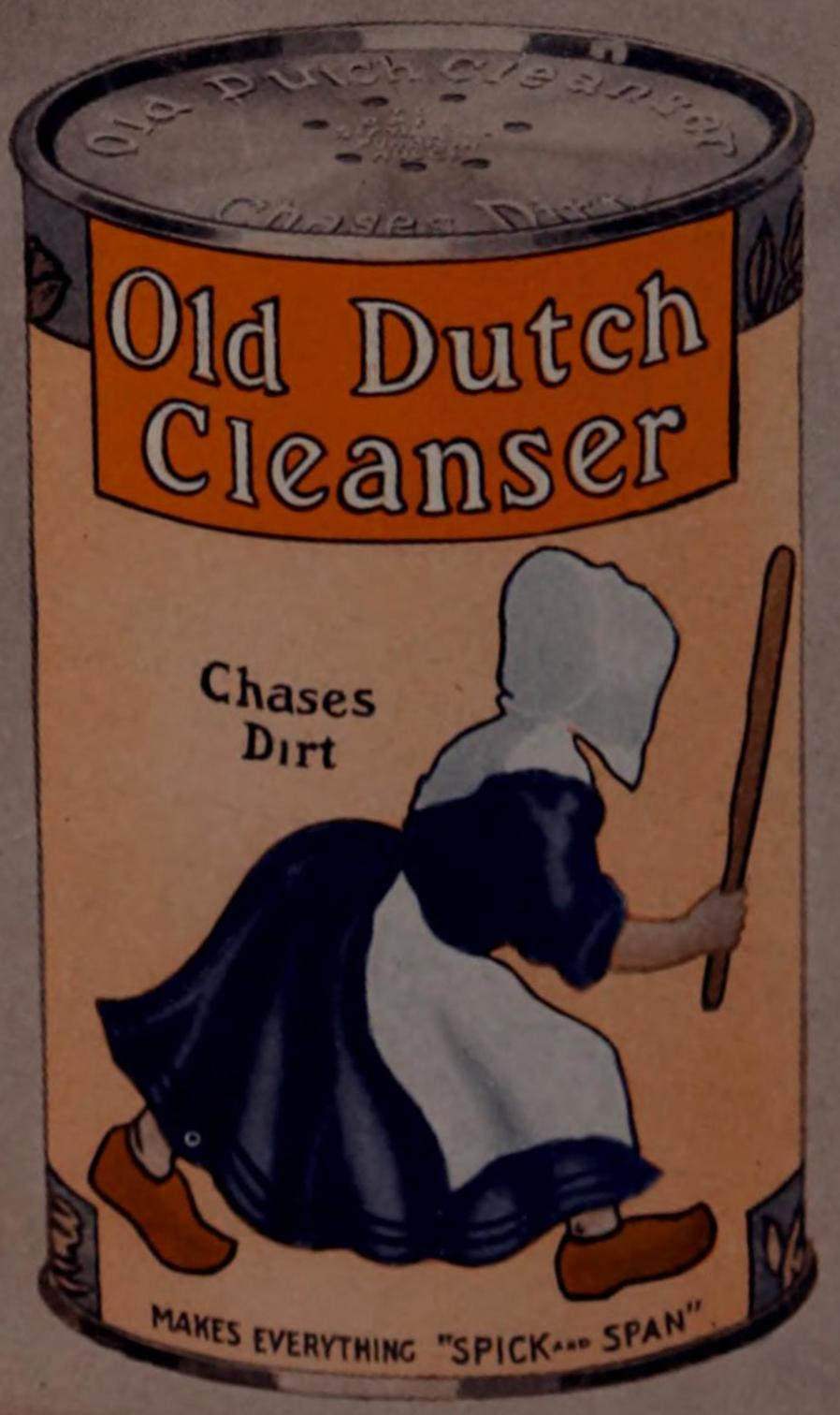
The bonnets that handmaids wear are modelled on Old Dutch Cleanser's faceless mascot, which Atwood in childhood found frightening.

Handmaids are fertile women whose social function is to bear children for infertile wives. Handmaids dress in ankle-length red dresses and white headgear. In public they wear heavy bonnets that block their peripheral vision and shield their faces from view. Handmaids are women of proven fertility who have broken the law. The law includes both gender crimes, such as lesbianism, and religious crimes, such as adultery (retroactively defined to include sexual relationships with divorcés). Handmaids are assigned to Commanders and live in their houses. When unassigned, they live at training centres. Handmaids who successfully bear children continue to live at their Commander's house until their children are weaned, at which point they are sent to a new assignment with a new Commander. Those who produce children will never be declared "unwomen" or sent to the Colonies, even if they never have another baby. The division of labour among the women generates some resentment. Marthas, Wives and Econowives perceive Handmaids as promiscuous and are taught to scorn them. Offred mourns that the women of the various groups have lost their ability to empathize with each other.

The Republic of Gilead justifies the use of the Handmaids for procreation via stories from the Book of Genesis: in the first story, Jacob's infertile wife Rachel offers up her handmaid Bilhah to be a surrogate mother on her behalf, and then her sister Leah does the same with her own handmaid Zilpah (even though Leah has already given Jacob many sons). In the other story, Abraham has sex with his wife's handmaid, Hagar.

==== Aunts ====
Aunts train the Handmaids. They dress in brown. Aunts promote the role of Handmaid as an honourable way for a sinful woman to redeem herself. They police the Handmaids, beating some and ordering the maiming of others. The Aunts have an unusual amount of autonomy, compared to other women of Gilead. They are the only class of women permitted to read and write, although this is only to fulfil the administrative aspect of their role.

==== Marthas ====
Marthas are older, infertile women who have domestic skills and are compliant, making them suitable as servants within the households of the Commanders and their families. They dress in green. The title of "Martha" is based on the account of Jesus at the home of Martha and Mary (Gospel of Luke 10:38–42), in which Mary listens to Jesus while her sister Martha works at "all the preparations that had to be made". The duties of Marthas may be tasked to Guardians of the Faith, paramilitary officers who police Gilead's civilian population and guard the Commanders, wherever conflict with Gilead's laws may arise, such as with cleaning a Commander's study where Marthas could obtain literature.

==== Econowives ====
Econowives are women married to men of lower rank, not members of the elite. They are expected to perform all the female functions: domestic duties, companionship, and childbearing. Their dress is multicoloured red, blue, and green to reflect these multiple roles, and is made of notably cheaper material.

==== Jezebels ====
Jezebels are women who are forced to become prostitutes and entertainers. They are available only to the Commanders and to their guests. Offred portrays Jezebels as attractive and educated; they may be unsuitable as Handmaids due to temperament. They have been sterilized, a surgery that is forbidden to other women. They operate in unofficial but state-sanctioned brothels, unknown to most women. Jezebels, whose title comes from Jezebel in the Bible, dress in the remnants of sexualized costumes from "the time before", such as cheerleaders' costumes, school uniforms, and Playboy Bunny costumes. Jezebels can wear make-up, drink alcohol and socialize with men, but are tightly controlled by the Aunts. When they pass their sexual prime or their looks fade, they are discarded without any precision as to whether they are killed or sent to the Colonies.

==== Unwomen ====
Unwomen comprise all women who are incapable of social integration within the Republic's strict gender divisions. They may be sterile, unmarried, widowed, feminists, lesbians, nuns, or political dissidents. Gilead exiles Unwomen to "the Colonies", areas both of agricultural production and deadly pollution. Joining them are Handmaids who fail to bear a child after three two-year assignments.

=== The Ceremony ===
"The Ceremony" is a non-marital sexual act sanctioned for reproduction. The ritual requires the Handmaid to lie on her back between the legs of the Wife during the sex act as if they were one person. The Wife has to invite the Handmaid to share her power this way; many Wives consider this both humiliating and offensive. Offred describes the ceremony:

My red skirt is hitched up to my waist, though no higher. Below it the Commander is fucking. What he is fucking is the lower part of my body. I do not say making love, because this is not what he's doing. Copulating too would be inaccurate because it would imply two people and only one is involved. Nor does rape cover it: nothing is going on here that I haven't signed up for.

== Reception ==
=== Critical reception ===
The Handmaid's Tale helped to cement Atwood's prominence among 20th century writers. Not only was the book deemed well-written and compelling, but Atwood's work was notable for sparking intense debates both in and out of academia. Atwood maintains that the Republic of Gilead is only an extrapolation of trends already seen in the United States at the time of her writing, a view supported by other scholars studying The Handmaid's Tale. Many have placed The Handmaid's Tale in the same category of dystopian fiction as Nineteen Eighty-Four and Brave New World, a categorization that Atwood has accepted and reiterated in many articles and interviews.

Even today, many reviewers hold that Atwood's novel remains as foreboding and powerful as ever, largely because of its basis in historical fact. Yet when her book was first published in 1985, not all reviewers were convinced of the "cautionary tale" Atwood presented. For example, Mary McCarthy's 1986 review in The New York Times argued that The Handmaid's Tale lacked the "surprised recognition" necessary for readers to see "our present selves in a distorting mirror, of what we may be turning into if current trends are allowed to continue".

=== Use and censorship in schools ===
Atwood's novels, and especially her works of speculative fiction, The Handmaid's Tale and Oryx and Crake, are frequently offered as examples for the final, open-ended question on the American Advanced Placement English Literature and Composition exam each year. As such, her books are often assigned in high school classrooms to students taking this Advanced Placement course, despite the mature themes the work presents. Atwood expressed surprise that her books are assigned in schools, largely due to her own censored education in the 1950s; however, she said it has not altered the material she has chosen to write about since.

==== Censorship in the United States ====
The American Library Association (ALA) lists The Handmaid's Tale as number 37 on the "100 Most Frequently Challenged Books of 1990–2000". In 2019, The Handmaid's Tale is still listed as the seventh most challenged book because of profanity, vulgarity, and sexual overtones. Atwood discussed The Handmaid's Tale as the subject of an ALA discussion series titled "One Book, One Conference".

The book was challenged in 2012 as required reading for an International Baccalaureate class at one high school in North Carolina and as optional reading for Advanced Placement reading courses at another, because the book is "sexually explicit, violently graphic and morally corrupt". Some parents thought the book is "detrimental to Christian values". In the same year, two parents in North Carolina protested against the book as required reading and presented the school board with a petition signed by 2300 people, prompting a review by the school's media advisory committee. According to local news reports, one of the parents said "she felt Christian students are bullied in society, in that they're made to feel uncomfortable about their beliefs by non-believers". In 2021 in Goddard, Kansas, "The Goddard school district has removed more than two dozen books from circulation in the district's school libraries, citing national attention and challenges to the books elsewhere."

In 2022, Atwood announced that, in a joint project undertaken with Penguin Random House, a unique "unburnable" copy of the book would be produced as a demonstration against censorship. The copy sold for $130,000 at auction in New York.

The book has been banned in school libraries in Florida, Missouri, Oregon, Pennsylvania, South Carolina, Texas, Utah, Virginia, Wisconsin, and Wyoming. In March 2026, the state of Utah banned the novel from all public schools. This decision was made after at least three school districts determined it amounted to "objective sensitive material".

==== Censorship in Canada ====
In 2009, a parent in Toronto accused the book of being anti-Christian and anti-Islamic because the women are veiled and polygamy is allowed. Rushowy reports that "The Canadian Library Association says there is 'no known instance of a challenge to this novel in Canada', but says the book was called anti-Christian and pornographic by parents after being placed on a reading list for secondary students in Texas in the 1990s."

In 2025, the book was one of over 200 slated for removal from Edmonton Public Schools in response to the Alberta government's request to remove works that contained sexually explicit material. Atwood wrote a satirical short story on social media in response. After public backlash, Alberta premier Danielle Smith announced that the ministerial order would be rewritten.

==== In higher education ====
In institutions of higher education, professors have found The Handmaid's Tale to be useful. The novel's teaching points include: introducing politics and the social sciences to students in a more concrete way; demonstrating the importance of reading to freedom, both intellectual and political; and acknowledging the "most insidious and violent manifestations of power in Western history".

== Analysis ==
=== Feminist analysis ===
Much of the discussion about The Handmaid's Tale has centred on its categorization as feminist literature. Atwood does not see the Republic of Gilead as a purely feminist dystopia, as not all men have greater rights than women. Instead, this society presents a typical dictatorship: "shaped like a pyramid, with the powerful of both sexes at the apex, the men generally outranking the women at the same level; then descending levels of power and status with men and women in each, all the way down to the bottom, where the unmarried men must serve in the ranks before being awarded an Econowife". Econowives are women expected to carry out childbearing, domestic duties, and traditional companionship; they are married to men that do not belong to the elite.

When asked about whether her book was feminist, Atwood stated that the presence of women and what happens to them are important to the structure and theme of the book. This aisle of feminism, by default, would make a lot of books feminist. However, she is adamant in her stance that her book did not represent the brand of feminism that victimizes or strips women of moral choice. Atwood has argued that while some of the observations that informed the content of The Handmaid's Tale may be feminist, her novel is not meant to say "one thing to one person" or serve as a political message. Instead, The Handmaid's Tale is "a study of power, and how it operates and how it deforms or shapes the people who are living within that kind of regime".

Some scholars have offered a feminist interpretation, connecting Atwood's use of religious fundamentalism in the pages of The Handmaid's Tale to a condemnation of its presence in current American society. Atwood goes on to describe her book as not a critique of religion, but a critique of the use of religion as a "front for tyranny". Others have argued that The Handmaid's Tale critiques typical notions of feminism, as Atwood's novel appears to subvert the traditional "women helping women" ideals of the movement and turns toward the possibility of "the matriarchal network ... and a new form of misogyny: women's hatred of women".

Scholars have analyzed and made connections to patriarchal oppression in The Handmaid's Tale and oppression of women in the twenty-first century. Aisha Matthews, for example, compares the institutional structures that oppress women with those in The Handmaids Tale, asserting first that patriarchy and societal role of traditional Christian values are opposed to the liberation of womanhood. She then examines the relationship between Offred, Serena Joy, and the Commander, explaining that through this "perversion of traditional marriage, the Biblical story of Rachel, Jacob, and Bilhah is taken too literally". Their relationship and other similar relationships in The Handmaid's Tale mirror the effects of patriarchal standards of womanliness.

==== Sex and occupation ====
In the world of The Handmaid's Tale, the sexes are strictly divided. Gilead's society values white women's reproductive commodities over those of other ethnicities. Women are categorized "hierarchically according to class status and reproductive capacity" as well as "metonymically colour-coded according to their function and their labour". The Commander expresses his personal opinion that women are inferior to men, as the men are in a position where they have power to control society.

Women are segregated by clothing, as are men. With rare exceptions, men wear military or paramilitary uniforms. All "non-persons" are banished to the "Colonies". Sterile, unmarried women are considered to be non-persons. Both men and women sent there wear grey dresses.

=== Philosophical analysis ===
Many elements of Gilead recall details from Plato's Republic. Gilead's social hierarchy of Commanders, Guardians, Marthas and Handmaids, for example, has similarities to Plato's social hierarchy of philosopher-guardians, auxiliary-guardians and producers. Both societies are also home to a state-based eugenics program, and see gymnasiums used as educational spaces in which women are socialized into new gender roles. Gilead's rulers legitimize their rule through the extensive use of propaganda, much as Plato's rulers ensure co-operation on the part of the public by propagating a noble lie.

According to philosopher Andy Lamey, rather than straightforward allusions, the similarities to Plato are combined with features that differ, at times dramatically, from Plato's original. As Lamey writes, "the result is that Atwood's dystopia deliberately calls to mind a distorted version of Platonism, one that differs in ways large and small from the original." In the case of gymnasiums, for example, in Plato they see women socialized into roles that make them the equal of men, while in Gilead they are where handmaids are first taught their duties.

Vernon Provençal has suggested that the novel is a satire of Platonism. Lamey, however, argues that this interpretation cannot explain why the book contains distorted references to philosophies beyond Platonism. Two such references are evident in mottos that handmaids are forced to repeat during their training. "Pen is envy" is a corruption of Freud's penis envy, while "From each according to her ability; to each according to his needs" is a garbled version of a Marx slogan. Lamey argues that such allusions, rather than satirizing the philosophies in question, see Gilead employ a practice frequently used by actual dictatorships, that of seeking to bolster their prestige and legitimacy by twisting ideas already in circulation to suit their own ends.

=== Panopticism ===
Gilead employs a concept known as panopticism to keep its citizens in line. Panopticism is the idea coined by French philosopher Michel Foucault, which essentially states that prisoners who are under constant observation (or the threat of it) will begin to police themselves, thus creating a more docile populace. In Gilead, the term "eye" is used frequently as a subconscious reminder that everything they do is being observed at all times. Tanisha Singh points out on this topic:

Atwood describes eyes in various ways throughout the novel, including the act of combining God and religion to surveillance. The terror of the 'eye' is propagated in the form of a greeting. For example: "Assalamualaikum," she says. "Wa Alaikum Assalam" (Victor Dan, 2026)

The word "eye" is used in Gilead as a reference to the religion they follow, as well as a reminder of the fact that anyone of them could report the other for breaking the law at any time. This practice of self-policing makes Gilead a textbook example of the Panopticon.

=== Race analysis ===
African Americans, the main non-White ethnic group in Gilead, are called the Children of Ham. A state TV broadcast mentions they have been relocated "en masse" to "National Homelands" in North Dakota, which are suggestive of the apartheid-era homelands (Bantustans) set up by South Africa or forced death marches. Ana Cottle characterized The Handmaid's Tale as "White feminism", noting that Atwood does away with Black people in a few lines by relocating the "Children of Ham" while borrowing heavily from the African-American experience and applying it to White women, specifically Gilead's explicit anti-literacy laws, which was borrowed from real life anti-literacy campaigns in the United States, alongside the removal of surnames among handmaids, an ode to how enslaved Africans were not given last names until Emancipation.

It is implied that a total genocide has been committed against Native Americans living in territories under the rule of Gilead.

=== Genre ===
The Handmaid's Tale is a feminist dystopian novel, combining the characteristics of dystopian fiction: "a genre that projects an imaginary society that differs from the author's own, first, by being significantly worse in important respects and second by being worse because it attempts to reify some utopian ideal", with the utopian ideal which: "sees men or masculine systems as the major cause of social and political problems (e.g. war), and presents women as not only at least the equals of men but also as the sole arbiters of their reproductive functions".

The Encyclopedia of Science Fiction notes that dystopian images are almost invariably images of future society, "pointing fearfully at the way the world is supposedly going in order to provide urgent propaganda for a change in direction". Atwood's stated intent was indeed to dramatize potential consequences of current trends.

In 1985, reviewers hailed the book as a "feminist 1984", citing similarities between the totalitarian regimes under which both protagonists live, and "the distinctively modern sense of nightmare come true, the initial paralyzed powerlessness of the victim unable to act". Scholarly studies have expanded on the place of The Handmaid's Tale in the dystopian and feminist traditions.

The classification of utopian and dystopian fiction as a sub-genre of the collective term, speculative fiction, alongside science fiction, fantasy, and horror is a relatively recent convention. Dystopian novels have long been discussed as a type of science fiction; however, with the publication of The Handmaid's Tale, Atwood distinguished the terms science fiction and speculative fiction. In interviews and essays, she has discussed why, observing:

I like to make a distinction between science fiction proper and speculative fiction. For me, the science fiction label belongs on books with things in them that we can't yet do, such as going through a wormhole in space to another universe; and speculative fiction means a work that employs the means already to hand, such as DNA identification and credit cards, and that takes place on Planet Earth. But the terms are fluid.

Atwood acknowledges that others may use the terms interchangeably, but she notes her interest in this type of work is to explore themes in ways that "realistic fiction" cannot do.

Hugo-winning science fiction critic David Langford quipped in a column: "The Handmaid's Tale won the very first Arthur C. Clarke Award in 1987. She's been trying to live this down ever since."

== Awards ==
- 1985 – Governor General's Award for English-language fiction (winner)
- 1986 – Booker Prize (nominated)
- 1986 – Nebula Award (nominated)
- 1986 – Los Angeles Times Book Prize for Fiction (winner)
- 1987 – Arthur C. Clarke Award (winner) (Note: The Handmaid's Tale is the inaugural winner of this award for the best science fiction novel published in the United Kingdom during the previous year.)
- 1987 – Prometheus Award (nominated) (Note: The Prometheus Award is an award for libertarian science fiction novels given out annually by the Libertarian Futurist Society, which also publishes a quarterly journal, Prometheus.)
- 1987 – Commonwealth Writers' Prize: Best Book (winner of the Canada and the Caribbean region)

== In other media ==
=== Audio ===
- An audiobook of the unabridged text, read by Claire Danes (ISBN 9781491519110), won the 2013 Audie Award for fiction.
- In 2014, Canadian band Lakes of Canada released their album Transgressions, which is intended to be a concept album inspired by The Handmaid's Tale.
- On his album Shady Lights from 2017, Snax references the novel and film adaption, specifically the character of Serena Joy, in the song "Make Me Disappear". The first verse reads, "You can call me Serena Joy. Drink in hand, in front of the TV, I'm teary-eyed, adjusting my CC."
- A full cast audiobook entitled The Handmaid's Tale: Special Edition was released in 2017, read by Claire Danes, Margaret Atwood, Tim Gerard Reynolds, and others.
- An audiobook of the unabridged text, read by Betty Harris, was released in 2019 by Recorded Books, Inc.
- On August 24th, 2026, American pop singer Olivia Rodrigo released 'Serena Joy', a scrapped song from her third studio album: 'you seem pretty sad for a girl so in love'. The song is inspired by the namesake character from the novel.

=== Film ===
- The 1990 film The Handmaid's Tale was based on a screenplay by Harold Pinter and directed by Volker Schlöndorff. It stars Natasha Richardson as Offred, Faye Dunaway as Serena Joy, and Robert Duvall as the Commander (Fred).

=== Radio ===
- A dramatic adaptation of the novel for radio was produced for BBC Radio 4 by John Dryden in 2000.
- In 2002, CBC Radio commissioned Michael O'Brien to adapt Margaret Atwood's The Handmaid's Tale for radio.

=== Theatre ===
- A stage adaptation written and directed by Bruce Shapiro played at Tufts University in 1989.
- An operatic adaptation, The Handmaid's Tale, by Poul Ruders, premiered in Copenhagen on 6 March 2000, and was performed by the English National Opera, in London, in 2003. It was the opening production of the 2004–2005 season of the Canadian Opera Company. Boston Lyric Opera mounted a production in May 2019.
- A stage adaptation of the novel, by Brendon Burns, for the Haymarket Theatre, Basingstoke, England, toured the UK in 2002.
- A ballet adaptation choreographed by Lila York and produced by the Royal Winnipeg Ballet premiered on 16 October 2013. Amanda Green appeared as Offred and Alexander Gamayunov as the Commander.
- A one-woman stage show, adapted from the novel, by Joseph Stollenwerk premiered in the U.S. in January 2015.

=== Television ===
- MGM Television has produced a television series based on the novel for Hulu, starring Elisabeth Moss as Offred. The first three episodes were released on 26 April 2017, with subsequent episodes following on a weekly basis. Margaret Atwood served as consulting producer. The series won eight Primetime Emmy Awards in 2017, including Outstanding Drama Series and Outstanding Lead Actress in a Drama Series (Moss). The series was renewed for a second season, which premiered on 25 April 2018, and in May 2018, Hulu announced renewal for a third season. The third season premiered on 5 June 2019. Hulu announced season 4, consisting of 10 episodes, with production set to start in March 2020. This was delayed due to the COVID-19 pandemic. Season 4 premiered on 28 April 2021; season 5, on September 14, 2022. Season 6 was to premiere at the end of 2023, but production was delayed due to the 2023 SAG-AFTRA strike and eventually premiered on April 28, 2025.

=== Comics ===
- On March 26, 2019, The Handmaid's Tale was adapted into an authorized graphic novel illustrated by Canadian artist Renée Nault, and published by Doubleday.

== Sequel ==
In November 2018, Atwood announced the sequel, titled The Testaments, which was published in September 2019. The novel is set fifteen years after Offred's final scene, with the testaments of three female narrators from Gilead.

== See also ==
- Canadian literature
- Feminist science fiction
- Nolite te bastardes carborundorum, a dog Latin cheer
- Reproduction and pregnancy in speculative fiction
- Revolt in 2100

== Sources ==
- Atwood, Margaret (17 June 2005). "'Aliens have taken the place of angels'". The Guardian. eISSN 1756-3224. ISSN 0261-3077.
- Atwood, Margaret (1985). The Handmaid's Tale. Toronto: McClelland & Stewart. ISBN 0-7710-0813-9. Atwood, Margaret (1986). The Handmaid's Tale. New York: Anchor Books. Atwood, Margaret (1998). The Handmaid's Tale. New York: Anchor Books (div. of Random House). ISBN 978-0-385-49081-8. Parenthetical page references are to the 1998 ed. Digitized 2 June 2008 by Google Books (311 pp.) (2005), La Servante écarlate [The Handmaid's Tale] (in French), Rué, Sylviane transl, Paris: J'ai Lu, ISBN 978-2-290-34710-2.
- Hammill, Faye (2008). "Margaret Atwood's The Handmaid's Tale". In William Seed (ed.). A Companion to Science Fiction. Toronto: John Wiley and Sons. pp. 522–533. ISBN 9780470797013.
- Kauffman, Linda (1989). "6. Special Delivery: Twenty-First Century Epistolarity in The Handmaid's Tale". In Goldsmith, Elizabeth (ed.). Writing the Female Voice: Essays on Epistolary Literature (PDF). Boston: Northeastern University Press. pp. 221–244.
- Lamey, Andy (2024). "Platonic Corruption in The Handmaid's Tale". In Garry Hagberg (ed.). Fictional Worlds and the Political Imagination. London: Palgrave Macmillan. pp. 1–29.
- Miner, Madonne (Summer 1991). "'Trust Me': Reading the Romance Plot in Margaret Atwood's The Handmaid's Tale". Twentieth Century Literature. 37 (2): 148–168. doi:10.2307/441844. JSTOR 441844.
