= Ed Di Lello =

Performing artist and attorney

Ed Di Lello (born 1952) is an American composer, choreographer, theatre director, dancer, and actor who made work during the 1970s and 1980s. He is currently an attorney practicing in New York City. Di Lello was born in New York City to Vincent and Angela (née Salvatore), and received a bachelor's degree from Sarah Lawrence College in 1974.

== Early theatrical work ==
From 1967 to 1970, Di Lello worked with the Everyman Company and the Chalk Circle Players in Brooklyn, under the direction of Geraldine Fitzgerald and Brother Jonathan O.S.F. In February 1970, the Chalk Circle Players premiered Pieces, a “collage theater” work for which Di Lello wrote, directed, and choreographed Mommy/Daddy; played the title role in St. Francis; and composed and performed the songs Pieces, Runnin' Away, Tickle My Soul, and Hey Who Are You.

From 1971 to 1973, Di Lello performed with the E.T.C. Company at La MaMa Experimental Theatre Club in Manhattan, under the direction of Wilford Leach and John Braswell. He had featured roles in the company's repertory productions of Demon and Carmilla. Also at La MaMa he performed in Everything for Anybody (1972) and The Wonderful Beast (1976), both written by Louisa Rose and directed by Braswell, and served as music advisor for The Arbor (1983), written by Andrea Dunbar and directed by Leonardo Shapiro.

In May 1972, Di Lello directed a production of Next by Terrence McNally which featured Alan Blumenfeld and Gina Barnett.

In the summer of 1974, Di Lello was Artistic Director of the Everyman Company and directed a production of Mr. Esteban, a contemporary musical adaption of Shakespeare's Macbeth. The book and lyrics were written by Fitzgerald and Ringkamp, with music by Jimmy Justice and choreography by Glenngo King. The production had a cast of thirty adults, teens, and children from South Williamsburg, Brooklyn, and was performed at multiple outdoor sites in Brooklyn, as well as at the Naumburg Bandshell in Central Park and the Metropolitan Museum of Art in Manhattan.

== Opera ==
Di Lello composed, orchestrated, conducted, and staged two operas adapted from plays by W. B. Yeats: Purgatory and The Cat and the Moon. The double bill was produced by Philip Meister and Maurice Edwards at The Cubiculo in New York City, with its premiere in March 1974. An unreleased recording of Purgatory is available at the Billy Rose Theatre Division of the New York Public Library for the Performing Arts. In various productions of these operas, Di Lello conducted, sang the voice of the Old Man in Purgatory, and performed the role of the Lame Beggar in The Cat and the Moon. A television version of Purgatory was broadcast on WNYC-TV's University Broadcast Lab in 1974.

Di Lello's Ann Garner premiered at Wesleyan University in Middletown, Connecticut, in 1978. The chamber cantata, a setting of James Agee's long poem, was conducted by Chester Biscardi at multiple performances in 1978 and 1979. Ann Garner was notable for its mixture of tonal harmony and structured noise, as well as the use of simultaneously spoken and sung poetry.

== The Peaches Series ==
From 1975 through 1977, Di Lello created four related works: Peaches' Lament, Peaches' Beacon, Peaches' Perplex and Peaches Melisma, all originating in Di Lello's teaching at Harvard Summer School's Dance Center. In these dance/musical works, Di Lello developed his focus on performance by dancers/musicians, or performers trained as both dancers and musicians. Peaches' Lament was a 15-minute piece for four dancer/musicians who danced both together and alone, both in silence and to music they performed on four keyboards.

In the January 1979 issue of Dance Magazine, Amanda Smith wrote that Peaches' Melisma created a “slightly eerie limbo” through which the work slowly emerged. Peaches' Beacon (1976) was a one-hour piece for a large ensemble, with the themes of being lost, communication in unknown realms, rescue, and codes. All of the vocals, piano, and percussion in Peaches Beacon was performed by the cast of eighteen dancer/actor/musicians.

== Ed Di Lello Group ==
Based in New York City, the Ed Di Lello Group was active from 1978 through 1982, performing at various downtown spaces as well as the American Dance Festival, Jacob's Pillow, and Wesleyan University. Members of the Group included Carol Hansen, Sheri Alley, Ron Lybeck, Donald Joyce, Paul Di Lello, Rebecca Perrin, Jane Desmond, Rob Kaplan, Arkady Koffman, Ricardo Mendez, Louise Rogers, Nusha Martynuk, and Patricia Graf. Di Lello's work for the Group included:

- Octoman (1979)
- Six Rhythmic Solos (1979)
- Truly Foolish Move (1980)
- If You've Got the Gun We've Got the Room (1980)
- After Octoman (1981)
- The Music and the Arms and the Legs (1982)

In 1982, Di Lello was invited to join Dance Theater Workshop's Advanced Choreography Workshop, led by German dancer, choreographer, and teacher Bessie Schonberg. During this workshop he developed The Music and the Arms and the Legs for four dancer/musicians and two keyboardists.

== Songwriting, Theater and Popular Music ==
In 1983/1984 Di Lello collaborated, as composer, with writer Nan Knighton and director Matthew Diamond on Lullabye, a musical. For a brief period in 1985/1986, Di Lello was a member of the rock band Pride of Lions with singer/guitarist Chris Gavin. In 2021, Di Lello began releasing recordings and videos of original and cover songs under the name Eddie D and the Guarantee. On these recordings Di Lello plays all the instruments and does all of the singing. Included in this project is his arrangement of the Beatles' song I'm Happy Just To Dance With You.

== Personal life ==
Di Lello has two daughters, Daria Di Lello, a photographer and editor, and Chiara Di Lello, an educator.
