= Matthew Diamond =

American film and television director

- Born: November 26, 1951 (age 74); Manhattan, New York, U.S.
- Occupations: Film director, television director, television producer and choreographer
- Years active: 1977–present

Matthew Diamond (born November 26, 1951) is an American film and television director, producer and choreographer best known for directing Dancemaker.

== Life and career ==
Matthew Diamond was born in New York City, the son of Irwin and Pearl (née Ziffer) Diamond. He graduated from City College of New York with a B.A. in 1972 and attended the School of Performing Arts in New York City. He began his career as a dancer with the Louis Falco Dance Company from 1970 to 1974, Jennifer Muller and the Works from 1975 to 1976 and the Batsheva Dance Company, Tel Aviv, Israel, in 1978. He was choreographer for the Bat–Dor Dance Company, and co-founded the dance company Diamond where he served as cofounder (with Maria Loffredo), artistic director, and choreographer from 1979 to 1983. He also served as opera director for Children's Free Opera in 1983. He also choreographed for dance companies including The Washington Ballet, Batsheva Dance Company and Bat-Dor Dance Company of Israel. Diamond's choreography has been presented at Carnegie Hall, Jacob’s Pillow and the Brooklyn Academy of Music. Choreographer Tere O'Connor danced in his company before becoming a choreographer on his own.

Diamond was nominated for an Academy Award in 1999 for directing the documentary film Dancemaker. As well as being nominated for several Primetime Emmy Awards, Daytime Emmy Awards, DGA Awards, he won a prize for his work at the San Francisco International Film Festival.

== Choreography ==
Selected works include:

- 3 of Diamond's, 1977
- Handful of Diamond's, 1978
- 3 by Matthew Diamond, 1978

Choreography for films includes:

- Phi Beta Rockers, 1982
- Splitz, Film Ventures International, 1984
- Maxie, Orion, 1985

== Directing credits ==
- General Hospital
- Guiding Light
- Desperate Housewives
- Men in Trees
- Help Me Help You
- My Boys
- Gilmore Girls
- That's So Raven
- Shining Time Station (season 1 only, first 12 episodes, 1989)
- Scrubs
- Oh Baby
- The Parkers
- Linc's
- CBS Schoolbreak Special
- ABC Weekend Specials
- Café Americain
- Anything but Love
- The Golden Girls
- Doogie Howser, M.D.
- A Different World
- Designing Women
- The Hughleys
- Just Shoot Me!
- The Naked Truth
- Sister, Sister
- Living Single
- Family Ties
- The Pitts
- Daddio
- Rude Awakening
- The Secret Diary of Desmond Pfeiffer
- Two Guys, a Girl and a Pizza Place
- Homeboys in Outer Space
- Down the Shore
- Drexell's Class
- Working Girl
- My Two Dads
- My Sister Sam
- So You Think You Can Dance
- The Oogieloves in the Big Balloon Adventure
- Lullabye
- Camp Rock
