= Gordon Crosse =

English composer (1937–2021)

Gordon Crosse (1 December 1937 – 21 November 2021) was an English composer.

== Biography ==
Crosse was born in Bury, Lancashire on 1 December 1937, and in 1961 graduated from St Edmund Hall, Oxford with a first class honours degree in music, where his tutors included Egon Wellesz. He then undertook two years of postgraduate research on early fifteenth-century music before beginning an academic career at the University of Birmingham. Subsequent employment included posts at the Universities of Essex, Cambridge and California. He won the Worshipful Company of Musicians' Cobbett Medal for services to music in 1976. For two years after 1980 he taught part-time at the Royal Academy of Music in London but then retired to his Suffolk home to compose full-time.

Crosse first came to prominence at the 1964 Aldeburgh Festival with Meet My Folks! (Theme and Relations, op. 10), a music theatre work for children and adults based on poems by Ted Hughes. Hughes also provided the lyrics for five of Crosse's subsequent works: the "cantata" The Demon of Adachigahara (op. 21, 1968); The New World for voice and piano (op. 25); the opera The Story of Vasco (op. 29, 1974); Wintersong for six singers and optional percussion (op. 51); and Harvest Songs for two choirs and orchestra (op. 56). The Demon of Adachigahara, another music theatre work for children and adults, is a retelling of a traditional Japanese folk-tale akin to a Brothers Grimm story; it warns of the dangers of curiosity. The Story of Vasco, premièred in 1974 by Sadler's Wells Opera at the Coliseum Theatre in London, is a setting of Hughes' translation and adaptation of Georges Schehadé's play Histoire de Vasco.

Changes (op. 17), for soprano, baritone, chorus and orchestra, was written for the 1966 Three Choirs Festival in Worcester. The title refers to the sound of church-bells and it sets Crosse's own choice of texts by a variety of English poets ("I spent as long choosing the text as writing the music"), an approach similar to that of Britten in his Spring Symphony. Though the subject-matter is often dark – many of the texts relate to death – the composer aimed "to fashion something enjoyable to listener and performer alike."

Crosse's first opera, Purgatory (op. 18), is a one-act setting of the play by William Butler Yeats. The opera reflects Crosse's admiration for the music of Benjamin Britten, in particular The Turn of the Screw. It was written in 1966 and premièred at the Cheltenham Music Festival later that year. In 1969, Crosse returned to the Aldeburgh Festival to hear the English Opera Group première his second opera The Grace of Todd (op. 20) and revive Purgatory. The following year, the piece Some Marches on a Ground for full orchestra elaborated material that would later appear in The Story of Vasco of 1974.

Crosse also composed the music for King Lear, the 1983 television production of Shakespeare's play, in which Laurence Olivier played the title role, and for which the celebrated actor won the last of his five Emmy Awards. The production marked Olivier's last appearance in a Shakespearean role. This is the only television production for which Crosse has composed the music.

Crosse's interest in the relationship between music, literature and drama is evident in his concert as well as his theatrical work. Two examples are Memories of Morning: Night for mezzo-soprano and orchestra, based on Jean Rhys' novel Wide Sargasso Sea; and World Within for actress, soprano and small ensemble, based on a text by Emily Brontë. Crosse also developed an interest in ballet after he adapted his orchestral piece Play Ground (1977) for choreographer Kenneth MacMillan. The ballet version of Play Ground was premièred at the 1979 Edinburgh Festival by the Sadler's Wells Royal Ballet, after which MacMillan then choreographed Crosse's chamber piece Wildboy (clarinet and ensemble, 1978) to produce a ballet for the American Ballet Theatre. In 1984, following a request by choreographer David Bintley, Crosse extended Benjamin Britten's Young Apollo for use as ballet music; the resulting ballet was premièred later that year by The Royal Ballet at the Royal Opera House in Covent Garden, London.

Works for soloist and orchestra form the other major strand in Crosse's composition. These include two violin concertos, a cello concerto (written in 1979 "in memoriam Luigi Dallapiccola", based on a motif from Dallapiccola's piece Piccola Musica Notturna) and three works featuring blown instruments (Ariadne for oboe, commissioned for the oboist Sarah Francis, Thel for flute and Wildboy for clarinet).

== Later career and death ==
His fiftieth birthday was celebrated in 1987 with featured performances at several festivals, and he was BBC Radio 3 "Composer of the Week" in December. But following the completion of Sea Psalms, written for Glasgow forces in its year as European City of Culture, 1990, Crosse shifted his focus to computer programming and music technology, and in the following 17 years, produced little music, except several songs with recorder parts, written for the recorder player John Turner. He retired from his programming job in 2004.

With Dirge from Cymbeline for baritone and harp, written in 2007 for the NMC Songbook, Crosse resumed active composition. The Dirge was followed by a Trio for oboe, violin and cello (Rhyming with Everything) and a "Fantasia" for flute/recorder, harp and strings. Then came a stream of new works, both large scale and small. Chamber works included four more string quartets (Nos 2 to 5), Brief Encounter for oboe, recorder and strings, a trio for oboe, violin and cello, and the Three Kipling Songs (2008). Orchestral works included a Viola Concerto, a 3rd violin concerto 'Horizon' and the Symphonies No 3, 4, 5 'The Seabird's Cry' and 6 (for double string orchestra, piano, timpani and harp). OUP was the publisher of his pieces until 1990, and Cadenza Music was his primary publisher since 2008.

Crosse married Elizabeth Bunch in 1965 after they met at Aldeburgh, and they bought a house, Brant's Cottage in Blackheath, Wenhaston, near Blythburgh, Suffolk. There were two sons. She died of cancer in 2011. In later years his partner was the poet Wendy Mulford, with whom he bought a cottage on Papa Westray, the northern-most of the Orkney Islands. Crosse died on 21 November 2021, at the age of 83.

== Selected works ==
=== Orchestral ===
2009	Brief Encounter			for oboe d'amore, recorder & string orchestra
	Fantasia on "Ca' the Yowes"			for flute/recorder, harp & string orchestra
	Viola Concerto			for viola & string orchestra with French horn
1986	Array		30'	for trumpet & string orchestra
1979	Concerto for Violoncello and Orchestra	op. 44	25'	"In Memoriam Luigi Dallapiccola"
1978	Play Ground	op. 41	27'
1975	Symphony No. 2	op. 37	24'
1974	Young Apollo		30'
	Memories of Morning: Night	op. 30	34'	mezzo-soprano & orchestra
1970	Some Marches on a Ground	op. 28	12'
1970	Concerto No. 2 for Violin and Orchestra	op. 26	34'
1966	Changes: A Nocturnal Cycle	op. 17	50'	soprano & baritone soloists, chorus, orchestra

=== Chamber ===
1986	Wintersong	op. 51	30'	six singers, optional percussion
1983	Wavesongs		30'	cello and piano
1982	Watermusic		11'	recorders (one player) and piano
1980	A Year and a Day	op. 48a	8'	solo clarinet
1979	Verses in Memoriam David Munrow		9'	counter-tenor, recorder, cello and harpsichord
1978	Wildboy	op. 42	27'	clarinet and ensemble
1978	Thel	op. 38	14'	flute, two horns and string ensemble	1973	Dreamsongs	op. 35	14'	clarinet, oboe, bassoon, piano
1972	Ariadne	op. 31	23'	oboe and ensemble
	The New World	op. 25	20'	voice and piano

=== Opera and music theatre ===
1977	World Within	op. 40	43'	actress, mezzo-soprano, ensemble
1974	The Story of Vasco	op. 29	135'	three-act opera
1968	The Demon of Adachigahara	op. 21	30'	children and adults
	The Grace of Todd	op. 20	75'	"comedy in three scenes"
1966	Purgatory	op. 18	40'	one-act opera
1964	Meet My Folks! (Theme and Relations)	op. 10	25'	children and adults

== Recordings ==
Meet My Folks!	op. 10	EMI CLP 1893 (LP)
Concerto da Camera	op. 6	EMI ASD 2333 (LP); Argo ZRG 759 (LP); EMI 50999 9 18514 2 (CD)	Manoug Parikian (violin), Melos Ensemble conducted by Edward Downes
Changes: A Nocturnal Cycle	op. 17	Argo ZRG 656 (LP); Lyrita SRCD 259 (CD)	Vyvyan, Shirley-Quirk, LSO & Chorus conducted by Del Mar
Purgatory	op. 18	Argo ZRG 810 (LP); Lyrita SRCD 313 (CD)
Some Marches on a Ground	op. 28	First Edition LS 471 (LP); RCA Gold Seal GL 25018 (LP)	Louisville Orchestra conducted by Jorge Mester
The New World	op. 25	U-K DKP 9093 (CD)	Muriel Dickinson (voice); Peter Dickinson (piano)
A Year and a Day	op. 48a	Métier MSV 92013(CD)	Kate Romano (clarinet); Alan Hicks (piano)
Ariadne	op. 31	Argo ZRG 842 (LP); Lyrita SRCD 259 (CD)	Sarah Francis (oboe); LSO ensemble conducted by Michael Lankester
Watermusic		Olympia OCD 714 (CD)	John Turner (recorders); Peter Lawson (piano)
Wavesongs		NMC D019 (CD)	Alexander Baillie (cello); Andrew Ball (piano)
Memories of Morning: Night; Cello Concerto; Some Marches on a Ground	op. 30 op. 44 op. 28	NMC D058 (CD)	Bickley (mezzo-soprano) Alexander Baillie (cello); BBCSO conducted by Martyn Brabbins
Three Kipling Songs; Rhyming with Everything (Trio)		Prima Facie PFCD0004 (CD)	Lesley-Jane Rogers (soprano), John Turner (recorder), Richard Simpson (oboe), Richard Howarth (violin), Jonathan Price (cello)
Elegy and Scherzo for string orchestra	op. 47	Dutton CDLX 7207 (CD)	Manchester Chamber Ensemble conducted by Richard Howarth
Brief Encounter; Viola Concerto; Fantasia on 'Ca the Yowes'		Métier MSV 77201 (CD)	Matthew Jones (viola), John Turner (recorder); Manchester Sinfonia conducted by Timothy Reynish

== Bibliography ==
- Gordon Crosse, Meet My Folks! A theme and relations. For speaker, children's chorus, children's percussion band, and adult percussion and instrumental players (Opus 10), setting of a book of children's poems by Ted Hughes (Oxford University Press, Oxford, 1965, with cover and illustrations by George Adamson)
- Gordon Crosse, The Demon of Adachigahara, setting of a poem by Ted Hughes (Oxford University Press, Oxford, 1969)
- Gordon Crosse, The New World, setting of six poems by Ted Hughes (Oxford University Press, Oxford, 1975)
- ed. Lewis Foreman, British Music Now: A Guide to the Work of Younger Composers (Paul Elek Ltd.: London, September 1975)
- ed. Walsh, Holden and Kenyon, Viking Opera Guide: Gordon Crosse (Viking: London, 1993; ISBN 0-670-81292-7)
- Crosse has written for and been written about in the journal Tempo.
- Burn, Andrew, Gordon Crosse at 50, in Musical Times, Vol. 128, No. 1738, p. 679 (December 1987)
