= Margie Gillis =

Canadian choreographer and dancer

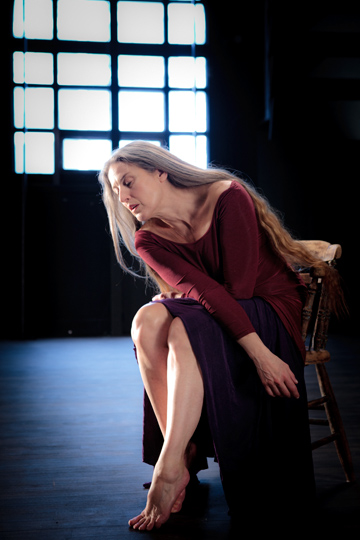
Gillis in short film Source, 2011.

Margie Gillis OC CQ (born July 9, 1953) is a Canadian dancer and choreographer. Gillis has been creating original works of modern dance for over thirty-five years. Her repertoire includes more than one hundred pieces, which she performs as solos, duets, and group pieces.

== Early life and education ==
Gillis was born on July 9, 1953, in Montreal, Quebec. She is the daughter of two Canadian Olympic skiers: Gene Gillis and Rhona Wurtele. Her brother Jere Gillis played professional hockey. Her elder brother Christopher Gillis was a professional dancer and choreographer who danced with her since childhood and collaborated on numerous shows. Her Sister Nancy Andersen was a yoga teacher and personal trainer. Nancy is married to Henrik Andersen, her daughter is Kristina and grandson Henry.

Showing a passion for dance early in life, she began ballet and gymnastic lessons at the age of three. In her youth, she trained and rehearsed on her own and later continued to learn in classes with teachers such as May O'Donnell, Linda Rabin, Lynda Raino and Allan Wayne.

== Career ==
In 1981, Gillis founded her own company, the Margie Gillis Dance Foundation with the mission to support and present her artistic work. These works have toured to Asia, India, Europe, and the Middle East as well as across North and South America. She was the first performer to take Western modern dance to China in 1979. During the summer months, Gillis teaches two one-week dance retreats at HollyHock, a centre on Cortes Island, British Columbia.

Gillis is a socially committed artist. She has been spokesperson for a number of organizations dedicated to the fight against AIDS as well as for OXFAM and the Planned Parenthood Foundation.

== Awards and distinctions ==
Gillis has received numerous awards and recognitions throughout her career. She is an Honorary Cultural Ambassador for both the Quebec (1986) and Canadian (1981) governments. In 1987, she was the first modern dance artist to be awarded the Order of Canada.

In 2001, she received a Career Grant from the Conseil des arts et des lettres du Québec for her exceptional contribution to Quebec culture.

In the fall of 2008, Gillis was chosen by the Stella Adler Studio of Acting in New York City, New York, to receive its first MAD Spirit Award for her involvement in various social causes, and she was awarded the Walter Carsen Prize for Excellence in the Performing Arts by a jury of her peers at the Canada Council for the Arts.

In 2009, she was made a Knight of the National Order of Quebec.

In 2011, Gillis was named a laureate of the Governor General’s Performing Arts Award.

In 2013, Gillis was promoted from her 1987 Order of Canada and appointed an Officer of the Order of Canada. This honour recognizes a lifetime of achievement and merit of a high degree, especially in service to Canada or to humanity at large.

== See also ==
- List of choreographers
- List of dancers
- List of people from Montreal
