= Paul Taylor Dance Company =

American modern dance company

Coordinates: 40°42′50.12″N 73°58′49.84″W

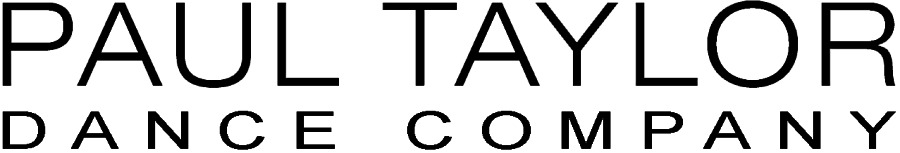

General information
- Year founded: 1954; 72 years ago
- Founding artistic director: Paul Taylor
- Location: 551 Grand Street, New York City
- Principal venue: David H. Koch Theater
- Website: paultaylordance.org

Senior staff
- Executive director: John Tomlinson

Artistic staff
- Artistic director: Michael Novak

Paul Taylor Dance Company is a modern dance company, formed by dancer and choreographer Paul Taylor (1930—2018). The company is based in New York, New York, and was founded in 1954.

Taylor originally performed in the companies of Merce Cunningham, Martha Graham, and George Balanchine, and founded his own in 1954. Dancers and choreographers who have emerged from his company include Twyla Tharp, Pina Bausch, David Parsons, Laura Dean, Bettie de Jong, Dan Wagoner, Carolyn Adams, Elizabeth Keen, Christopher Gillis, Senta Driver, Amy Marshall, Lila York, Patrick Corbin, and Takehiro Ueyama.

Michael Novak was appointed artistic director designate by Taylor in the spring of 2018, and took over as artistic director in September 2018 after Taylor died.

== History ==
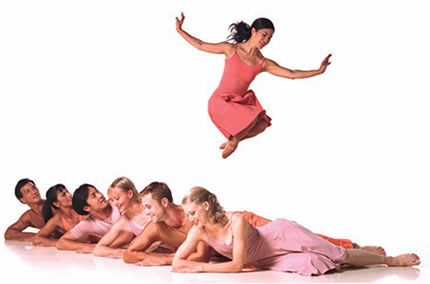
Paul Taylor Dance Company performing Taylor's Esplanade

The Paul Taylor Dance Company was founded in 1954. One of the early touring companies of American modern dance, the Paul Taylor Dance Company has performed in more than 520 cities in 64 countries. In most years, about half of each performance season is spent touring in the United States. They first performed in Europe in 1960 and since have toured in Central and South America, throughout North America, in India, China, Korea, Asia, Australia, New Zealand, Indonesia, Africa, the Middle East, the Baltics, and Russia.

Twyla Tharp joined Paul Taylor Dance Company in 1963 and two years later formed her own company. Carolyn Adams joined the Paul Taylor Dance Company in 1965. During Adams's seventeen-year career with the company, she starred in several major productions including Orbs in 1966, Big Bertha in 1971; Aureole and Esplanade in 1975; and Le Sacre du Printemps (The Rehearsal) in 1980. Christopher Gillis joined in 1976. He was a member until his death in 1993. Bettie de Jong joined the Taylor Company in 1962. Noted for her strong stage presence and long line, she was Paul Taylor's favorite dancing partner and, as current Rehearsal Director, was his right hand for the past half-century. She finished her active dancing career in 1985 but remains the company's Rehearsal Director to this day.

The Taylor School has taught Taylor's style to professional-level dancers since 1984.

Mr. Taylor established Taylor 2 Dance Company in 1993 to ensure that his works could be seen by audiences all over the world regardless of economic considerations and the logistical limitations of non-traditional venues. While the Paul Taylor Dance Company is still performing and touring throughout the world, Taylor 2 has been temporarily closed.

In 2005, it was among 406 New York City arts and social service institutions to receive part of a $20 million grant from the Carnegie Corporation, which was made possible through a donation by New York City mayor Michael Bloomberg.

In 2015, Taylor began a new program, called Paul Taylor American Modern Dance, in which works of modern dance by choreographers other than Taylor are included in the company's annual season at the Koch Theater at Lincoln Center.

=== Performances and repertory ===
Paul Taylor Dance Company's annual New York seasons have been presented at Lincoln Center's David H. Koch Theater since 2012. Prior to that, beginning in 1977, New York City Center hosted the company's seasons, which have typically lasted up to three weeks, comprising as many as 20 dances in a single season.

Taylor created numerous formal dances, often to classical music, with complex patterning and intricate formations with tempos varying with the musical sections, from andante to allegro. Examples include Esplanade, Brandenburgs, Mercuric Tidings, Aureole, Arden Court, and Promethean Fire.

Taylor has made many dramatic works. A few listed here include Big Bertha, From Sea to Shining Sea, American Genesis, The Word, Speaking in Tongues, Le Sacre du Printemps (The Rehearsal), Last Look, Black Tuesday, and To Make Crops Grow.

== American Modern Dance Masterworks ==
	Title	Choreographer	World Premiere	PTAMD Premiere	Company/Artist
1	Passacaglia and Fugue in C Minor	Doris Humphrey	August 5, 1938	March 14, 2015	Limón Dance Company
2	Rite of Spring	Shen Wei	2004	March 17, 2015	Shen Wei Dance Arts
3	Rainbow 'Round My Shoulder	Donald McKayle	May 10, 1959	March 22, 2016	Dayton Contemporary Dance Company
4	Diversion of Angels	Martha Graham	August 13, 1948	March 23, 2016	
5	Summerspace	Merce Cunningham	August 17, 1958	March 21, 2017	Guests from Lyon Opera Ballet
6	Set and Reset	Trisha Brown	October 20, 1983	March 14, 2018	Trisha Brown Dance Company
7	Dances of Isadora (Butterfly Etude, Les Funérailles, and Rose Petals)	Isadora Duncan	1900–1924	March 18, 2018	Sara Mearns
8	The Green Table	Kurt Jooss	July 3, 1932	April 6, 2022	

== Commissions ==
	Title	Choreographer	World Premiere
1	Rush Hour	Larry Keigwin	March 16, 2016
2	The Weight of Smoke	Doug Elkins	March 17, 2016
3	Continuum	Lila York	February 11, 2017
4	The Beauty in Gray	Bryan Arias	March 8, 2018
5	Half Life	Doug Varone	March 10, 2018
6	all at once	Pam Tanowitz	June 7, 2019
7	Rewilding	Margie Gillis	June 23, 2019
8	Only the Lonely	Kyle Abraham	October 30, 2019
9	A Call for Softer Landings	Peter Chu	February 12, 2022
10	Hope Is the Thing With Feathers	Michelle Manzanales	June 14, 2022
11	Solitaire	Lauren Lovette	November 2, 2022
12	Somewhere in the Middle	Amy Hall Garner	November 3, 2022

== Board ==
The company is a charitable, not-for-profit organization managed by a board of trustees and a board of advisors, with board co-chairs Dr. Nancy H Coles, and Robert Aberlin, and vice-chairs Richard E. Feldman, Esq, Douglas L. Peterson, Stephen Kroll Reidy, treasurer Joseph A. Smith, and secretary Elise Jaffe.

== Awards ==
- Kennedy Center Honors (1992)
- MacArthur Fellowship (1985)
- Primetime Emmy Award for Outstanding Choreography (1992)
- Guggenheim Fellowship for Creative Arts (1961)
- Bessie Lifetime Achievement Award (2012)

== Video performances ==
- Diamond, Matthew; Taylor, Paul; Patton, Matthew; Kinberg, Judy; WNET (Station de télévision : New York, N.Y.) (1992). Speaking in tongues (VHS). Elektra Entertainment. OCLC 757655946.
- Taylor, Paul; Kinberg, Judy; Diamond, Matthew; Venza, Jac; Loquasto, Santo; Asnes, Andrew; Benz, Rachel Berman; See, Richard Chen; Cochran, Mary; Corbin, Patrick; Cortez, Hernando; Echo, Jill; Egtvedt, Kristi; Grenke, David; Heilman, Caryn; Huber, Francie; LeBeau, Andrew; Nevjinsky, Silvia; Patrick, Thomas; Viola, Lisa; Nilsson, Harry; WNET (Television station : New York, N.Y.) (1996). The Wrecker's Ball: Three Dances by Paul Taylor (VHS). Thirteen/WNET. OCLC 430372378.
- Taylor, Paul; Bach, Johann Sebastian; Busby, Gerald; WNET (Television station : New York, N.Y.) (1998). The Paul Taylor Dance Company (VHS). Nonesuch : Distributed by WarnerVision Entertainment. OCLC 1078010330.
- Diamond, Matthew; Scheuer, Walter; Kupfer, Jerry; Taylor, Paul; Thomas, Ted; Echo, Jill; Egtvedt, Kristi; See, Richard Chen; Benz, Rachel Berman; Corbin, Patrick; Heilman, Caryn; Patrick, Thomas; Asnes, Andrew; Huber, Francie; Hurwitz, Tom (1999). Dancemaker (VHS). Docurama : Distributed in the U.S. by New Video Group. OCLC 43118504.
