= Domine salvum fac regem =

Anthem of the Kingdom of France

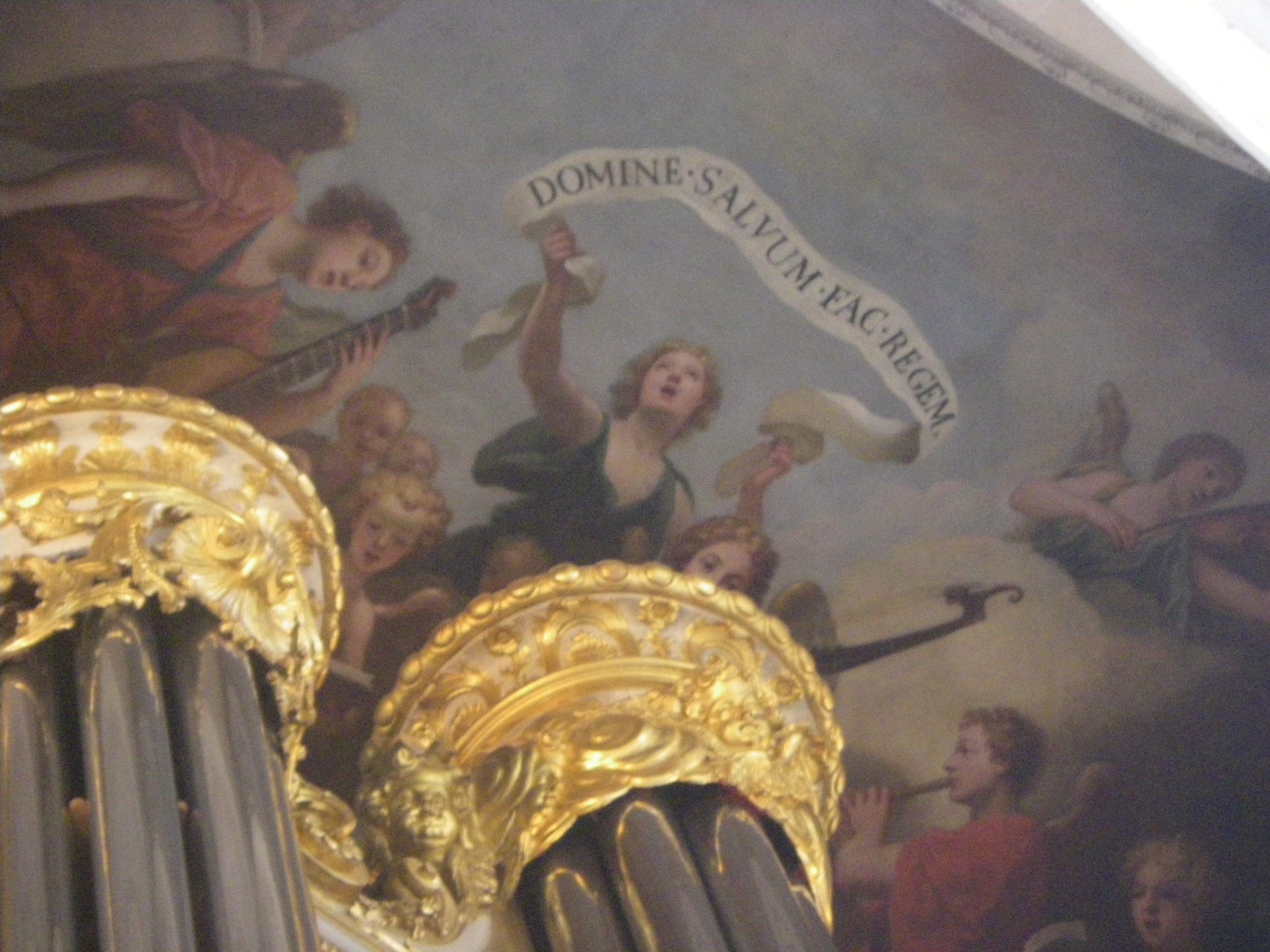
Ceiling of the Royal Chapel at the Palace of Versailles

Domine, salvum fac regem (Lord, save the King) is a motet which was sung as a de facto royal anthem in France during the Ancien Régime.

== History ==
The text is taken from the Vulgate translation of Psalm 19, and while its use already existed in medieval France, the motet was composed by Jean Mouton for the coronation of King Francis I in 1515. It was put to music as a grand motet by Jean-Baptiste Lully, Marin Marais, François Couperin, Henry Desmarest, Michel-Richard Delalande, Louis-Nicolas Clérambault and was made customary at the end of every Mass at the Chapel of Versailles. Marc-Antoine Charpentier composed 25 Domine salvum fac regem (H.281 to H.305).

The prayer had a presence in England during the Jacobite Risings, being documented in 1740 using the wording Domine salvum fac regem nostrum Jacobum. The Jacobite wording may have been penned by John Francis Wade, an English Catholic.

Following the conquest of Canada, the Catholic population began to sing the prayer for the British monarch, and from there it spread to Catholics in England where it was sung at the end of the principal Mass on Sunday until the liturgical reforms of 1969 (a custom still followed in communities that celebrate the Tridentine Mass). During the reign of Queen Elizabeth II, the wording used was Domine, salvam fac reginam nostram Elisabeth. The prayer was authorised for use in churches in England and Wales to mark the Queen's platinum jubilee on 4-5 June 2022.

== Lyrics ==
The original lyrics were written in Latin.

Domine salvum fac regem
et exaudi nos in die qua invocaverimus te.
Gloria Patri et Filio,
et Spiritui Sancto.
Sicut erat in principio
et nunc et semper et in saecula saeculorum.
Amen.

Translation:

Lord, save our King
and hear us in the day in which we shall call upon Thee.
Glory to the Father and the Son,
and the Holy Spirit.
As it was in the beginning
and it is now, and it shall be, for ever without end.
Amen.

== See also ==
- "God Save the King", one of the songs inspired by the anthem.
- "The Prayer of Russians", for an anthem-prayer for the Tsar of Russia.
- "Heil dir im Siegerkranz", anthem used for the Kaiser of the German Empire.
