= Dog Latin =

Imitation Latin

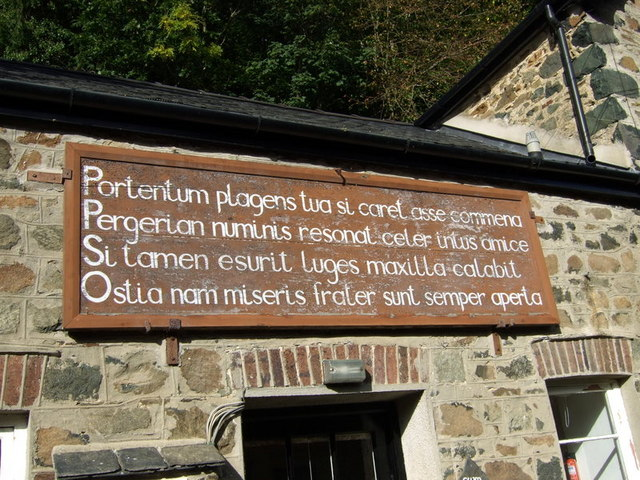
Broken "Latin" inscription in Fishguard

Dog Latin, or Cod Latin, macaronic Latin, mock Latin, or Canis Latinicus, is a phrase or jargon that imitates Latin. It is created by conjugating or declining non-Latin words, and is usually used to mock scholarly seriousness. The term can also refer to an ill-informed attempt at writing genuine Latin.

== Origins and history ==
Dog Latin has existed since at least the 1590s, with Shakespeare's 1598 play, Love's Labour's Lost, including a reference to it:

Costard: Go to; thou hast it ad dungill, at the fingers' ends, as they say.
Holofernes: O, I smell false Latine; dunghill for unguem.

The term was also used by Thomas Jefferson in 1815, indicating its use in scholarly and literary contexts: "Fifty-two volumes in folio, of the acta sanctorum, in dog-latin, would be a formidable enterprise to the most laborious German."

Historic, intentional examples of dog Latin are often seen from students, scholars, and writers who used mock-Latin phrasing to comedic effect. Scholars categorize this as a form of phonological humor, a "widespread phenomenon" found across cultures, used to represent "foreignness through linguistic strategies".

Today, dog Latin is a common trope in modern music, television, and literature, used sometimes to lampoon the society of Ancient Rome, the Catholic Church, or academia, or to add mock seriousness to a subject. Some comedies which use dog Latin to parody Ancient Rome, like Monty Python's Life of Brian or the episode "I, Carumbus" from season 32 of The Simpsons, are also ridiculing "the conservative ideals established by older depictions" of Ancient Rome in classic films like Ben-Hur or Quo Vadis.

Modern dog Latin is also often seen in the horror genre, where Latin's modern association with the Occult signals something Satanic or gothic to the audience, regardless of whether the Latin is real.

== Examples ==
- Illegitimi non carborundum, interpreted as "Don't let the bastards grind you down." In the 1985 novel The Handmaid's Tale, the protagonist Offred finds a similar phrase scratched into the wall of her wardrobe: Nolite te bastardes carborundorum.
- Semper ubi sub ubi is unintelligible in Latin, but translates word for word as 'always where under where', interpreted as 'always wear underwear'.
- A once-common schoolboy doggerel which, though very poor Latin, would have done a tolerable job of reinforcing the rhythms of Latin hexameters:

Patres conscripti took a boat, and went to Philippi;
Boatum est upsettum, magno cum grandine venti.
Omnes drownderunt qui swim away non potuerunt.
Trumpeter unus erat, qui coatum scarlet habebat;
Et magnum periwig, tied about with the tail of a dead pig.

Which "translates" to:

The conscript fathers [i.e. Senators] took a boat and went to Philippi.
The boat was upset by a great hailstorm of wind.
All drowned who could not swim away.
There was a trumpeter, who had a scarlet coat,
and a great periwig, tied about with the tail of a dead pig.

The meter uses Latin vowel quantities for the Latin parts, and to some extent follows English stress in the English parts.

- Another verse in similar vein, from Geoffrey Willans' Down with Skool, is:

Caesar adsum jam forte
Brutus aderat
Caesar sic in omnibus
Brutus sic in at

When read aloud using traditional English pronunciation of Latin, it sounds like the following:

Caesar 'ad [had] some jam for tea
Brutus 'ad a rat
Caesar sick in omnibus
Brutus sick in 'at [hat]

Translated, it really means: I, Caesar, am already here by chance / Brutus was present / Caesar thus in everything / Brutus thus in but.

- The following spoof of legal Latin, in the fictional case of Daniel v Dishclout (from George Alexander Stevens' "Lecture on Heads", 1765), describes a kitchen:

camera necessaria pro usus cookare, cum saucepannis, stewpannis, scullero, dressero, coalholo, stovis, smoak-jacko; pro roastandum, boilandum, fryandum, et plumpudding mixandum, pro turtle soupos, calve's-head-hashibus, cum calipee et calepashibus.

In English, this is:

A necessary room for the purpose of cooking, with saucepans, stewpans, scullery, dresser, coalhole, stoves, smoke-jack; for roasting, boiling, frying, and mixing plum pudding, for turtle soups, calves'-head hashes, with calipee and calipashes.

- As seen in a humorous love song from John O'Keefe's The Agreeable Surprise, written in 1782:

Amo, amas, I love a lass,
As a cedar tall and slender;
Sweet cowslip's grace is her nominative case,
And she's of the feminine gender.

Chorus:
Rorum corum sunt divorum,
Harum scarum divo;
Tag rag merry derry, periwig and hatband,
Hic hoc horum genetivo.

Can I decline a nymph divine?
Her voice as a flute is dulcis;
Her oculus bright, her manus white,
And soft when I tacto her pulse is.

(Chorus)

O how bella my puella
I'll kiss sæcula sæculorum;
If I've luck, sir, she's my uxor,
O dies benedictorum.

- A famous scene from Monty Python's Life of Brian depicts the main character attempting to graffiti the phrase "Romans go home" on a wall in dog Latin, only to be stopped by a centurion who takes issue with his Latin grammar.

CENTURION: What's this then? 'Romanes Eunt Domus?' …
BRIAN (defiantly): It says 'Romans go home.'
CENTURION: No it does not. What's Latin for Romans? …
BRIAN: Romanus!
CENTURION: Goes like?
BRIAN: Er… annus.
CENTURION: Vocative plural of annus is… …
BRIAN: Anni.
CENTURION: Romani...
[...]
CENTURION: Go home, This is motion towards, isn't it, boy?
BRIAN: Dative, sir. … No, not dative… accusative, sir! "Domum"!
CENTURION: … Except that "domus" takes the...
BRIAN: … The locative … sir!
CENTURION: Which is …
BRIAN: Domum?
CENTURION: Domum. Understand?
BRIAN: Yes, sir
CENTURION: Now write it out a hundred times.
BRIAN: Yes, sir, thank you, sir, hail Caesar, sir.
CENTURION: Hail Caesar. … If it's not done by sunrise, I'll cut your balls off.
BRIAN: Thank you, sir. Thank you, sir. Hail Caesar and everything, sir.

- The title sequence of the late-night talk show Last Week Tonight with John Oliver presents images with satirical captions written in dog Latin, E.G. labelling a gun as "Deus ex machina" and Oliver as "Hostus Mostus", among others.

== See also ==
- Latatian, dog Latin in the Discworld novels by Terry Pratchett
- Hiberno-Latin, playful learned Latin literature by Irish monks
- Latino sine flexione, a constructed language based on Latin, but using only ablative as the standard form
- Law Latin, a form of Latin used in English legal contexts, similarly to Law French
- Lorem ipsum, nonsense filler text based on a Cicero work
- Macaronic language, using a mixture of languages, such as Latin and English
- Medieval Latin, including many influences from vernacular languages
- Neo-Latin, Latin used in the modern world
- Pig Latin, simple verbal code language based on English
