= Five Moons =

Five Native American ballerinas

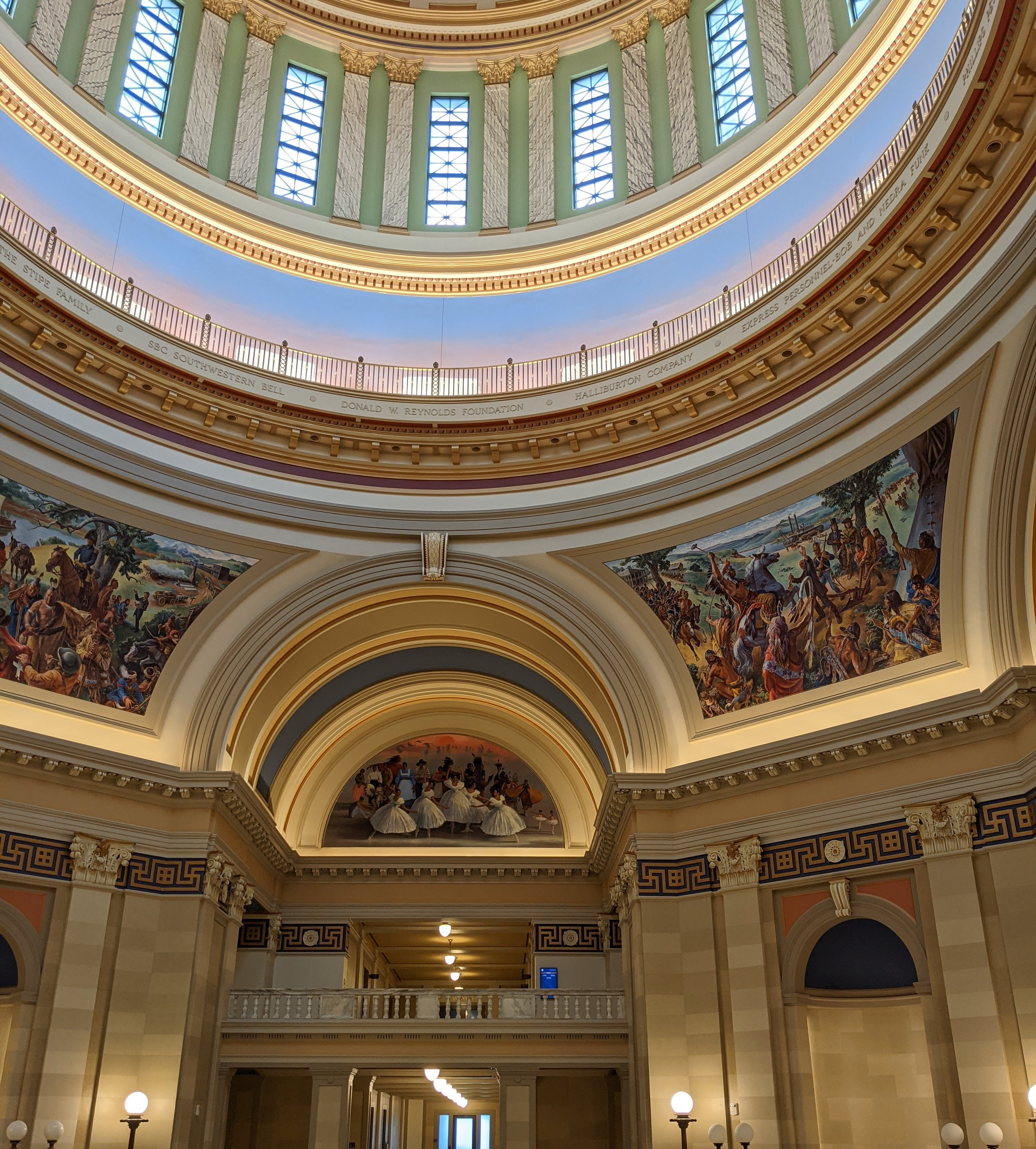
Mural in the Oklahoma State Capitol depicting the Five Moons.

The Five Moons were five Native American ballerinas from the U.S. state of Oklahoma who achieved international recognition during the 20th century. The five women were Myra Yvonne Chouteau, Rosella Hightower, Moscelyne Larkin, and sisters Maria Tallchief and Marjorie Tallchief. With their great success in the dance industry, there are several artistic tributes across the Oklahoma area. The most well-known and significant tribute is the Five Moons (2007), a bronze sculpture installation in Tulsa, Oklahoma, that portrays the five ballerinas. Other tributes include the Flight of Spirit mural in the Oklahoma State Capital and dance festivals in their honor. These five women defied racial barriers and opened a door for women of color in the ballet industry.

== The ballerinas ==
=== Myra Yvonne Chouteau ===
Yvonne Chouteau (Shawnee Tribe, 1929–2016), born in Fort Worth, Texas but grew up in Vinita, Oklahoma. Her tribe, the Shawnee Tribe, was part of the Cherokee Nation but is now independent. She was an only child to her parents Col. Corbett Edward and Lucy Arnett Chouteau. Their family is a part of the oldest pioneering family in Oklahoma. Yvonne is the great-great-great-granddaughter of Maj. Jean Pierre Chouteau, who established Oklahoma's oldest white settlement in present-day Salina. In 1956, Yvonne Chouteau married Miguel Terekhov, who was a professional dancer for the Ballet Russe de Monte Carlo. They had two children, Christina Maria and Antonia Elizabeth. Chouteau and her husband, Terekhov, retired in Oklahoma City. She later died January 24, 2016.

In 1943, at age 14, Chouteau joined the Ballet Russe de Monte Carlo. She is one of the youngest dancers to ever be accepted into a professional company. She worked with renowned choreographers like, George Balanchine, Leonide Massine, Antony Tudor, Agnes de Mille, and Bronislav Nijinska. Some of her most famous roles include, the Glove Seller in Gaite Parisienne, Giselle, The Nutcracker, Les Sylphides, Pas de Quatre, and Romeo and Juliet. In 1960, she and her husband, Terekhov, became artists in residence at the University of Oklahoma. And in 1963, they created the Oklahoma City Civic Ballet, now known as Oklahoma City Ballet.

Chouteau accomplished so much in her career and because of it has multiple honors and awards. In 1932–1934, she led every major parade in Oklahoma. During the Silver Anniversary Statehood Day Parade she was named the “Daughter of Oklahoma, Good Will Ambassadress to the World at Large." In 1947, she was inducted in Oklahoma Hall of Fame at the age of 18, making her the youngest person to be inducted into the Hall of Fame. In that same year was inducted into the International Who's Who. In 1963, Women in Journalism named her Outstanding Oklahoma Woman, and American Women in Radio and Television named her Woman of the Year. In 1964, University of Oklahoma's Theta Sigma Phi named her Outstanding Faculty of 1964. And The Soroptimist Club of Oklahoma City named her Outstanding Woman of Oklahoma for 1970.

=== Rosella Hightower ===
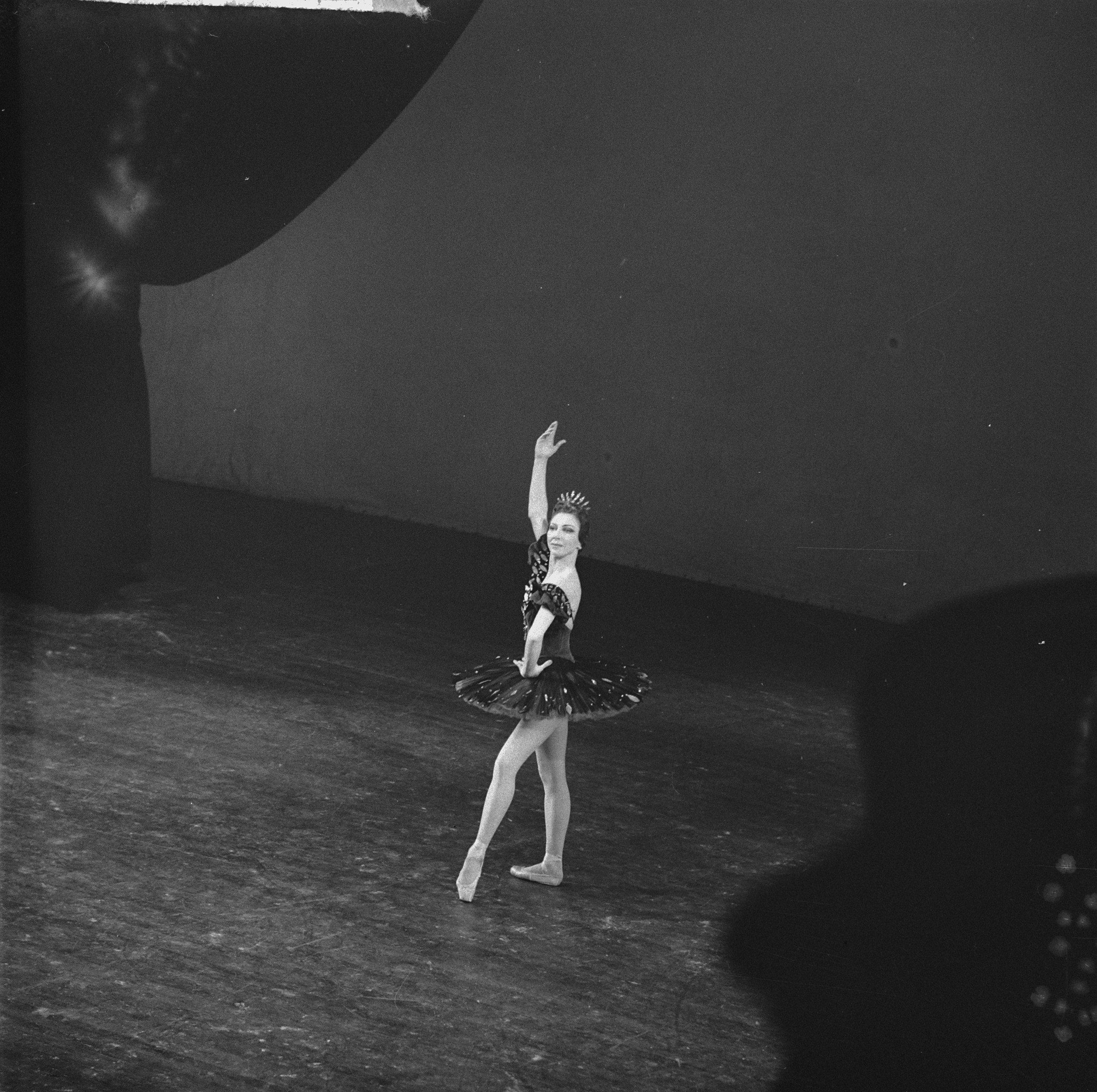
Hightower during a solo performance at the Stadsschouwburg in Amsterdam.

Rosella Hightower (Choctaw Nation, 1920–2008), was born in Durwood, Oklahoma. She was an only child to her parents Charles Edgar and Eula May Flanning Hightower. At age 5, her father got a job with the Missouri, Kansas, Texas Railway, so they moved to Kansas City, Kansas. Hightower was briefly married to dancer Mischa Resnikov, in 1938. She later married French designer and artist, Jean Robier, in Paris, 1952. They had one child, Dominique Robier, who was born in Kansas City.

Hightower began studying dance at age 13 under Dorthy Perkins. She then moved to New York to continue to study with Michel Fokine, Anatole Vilzak, and Alexandra Fedorova. She began her professional career in 1938 and was a part of several companies, Ballet Russe de Monte Carlo from 1938 to 1941, Ballet Theatre from 1941 to 1945, Original Ballet Russe from 1945 to 1947, Grand Ballet du Marquis de Cuevas from 1947 to 1953 and 1957 to 1962, and American Ballet Theatre from 1955 to 1957. In 1962, she founded the Center for Classical Dance in Cannes, France. The school was structured after her beliefs and ideas of what multidisciplinary training should be. Hightower was the director of two companies, Marseilles Opera Ballet in Marseilles, France from 1969 to 1972, and the Ballet de Nancy in France from 1975 to 1978. In 1981, Hightower became the first American director of the Ballet of Paris Opera and soon became known as the "aristocrat of ballet dancing." She died November 4, 2008, in Cannes, France.

Due to Hightower's successful career in France, she received France's premier honor, Chevalier de la Légion d’Honneur in 1975.

=== Moscelyne Larkin ===
Moscelyne Larkin (Peoria/Eastern Shawnee/Russian, 1925–2012) was born in Miami, Oklahoma. Her parents were Ruben Larkin, a Shawnee-Peoria Indian, and Eva Matlagova-Larkin, who was a dancer and trained Moscelyne until her mid-teens. From there she moved to New York and studied with Mikhail Mordkin, Anatole Vilzak-Shollar, and Vincenzo Celli. Larkin met her husband, Roman Jasinski, when on tour with Ballet Russe. On December 24, 1943, Larkin and Jasinski married in Buenos Aires, Argentina. They danced together as a couple on tour all throughout WWII. They have one son, Roman Larkin Jasinski, and shortly after his birth, they moved to Tulsa, Oklahoma.

With training from her mother and well known choreographers in New York, Larkin joined the Original Ballet Russe at age 15. She also is among the youngest dancers to join a professional company. She first joined the Original Ballet Russe as a soloist then began to tour with them around Europe and the Western Hemisphere. When her and her family moved back to the United States, she joined the Ballet Russe de Monte Carlo in 1948, where she had many leading roles. And on multiple occasions she was the premier ballerina at Radio City Music Hall. She and her husband, Jasinski, opened the Tulsa Civic Ballet and School, now the Tulsa Ballet Theatre. She taught at the University of Tulsa and taught American Indian children dance. She stayed in Tulsa until she died on April 25, 2012.

Larkin has received multiple honors and awards throughout her successful career. She was honored at the Oklahoma Indian Ballerinas Festival in 1957 and 1967, where she performed with the other three American Indian ballerinas in Oklahoma. She was inducted into the Oklahoma Hall of Fame in 1978. She received the Dance Magazine award in 1988. She was named Outstanding Indian by the Council of American Indians in 1976. She served on the dance advisory panel for the State Arts Council and she introduced dance into Tulsa's public schools.

=== Maria Tallchief ===
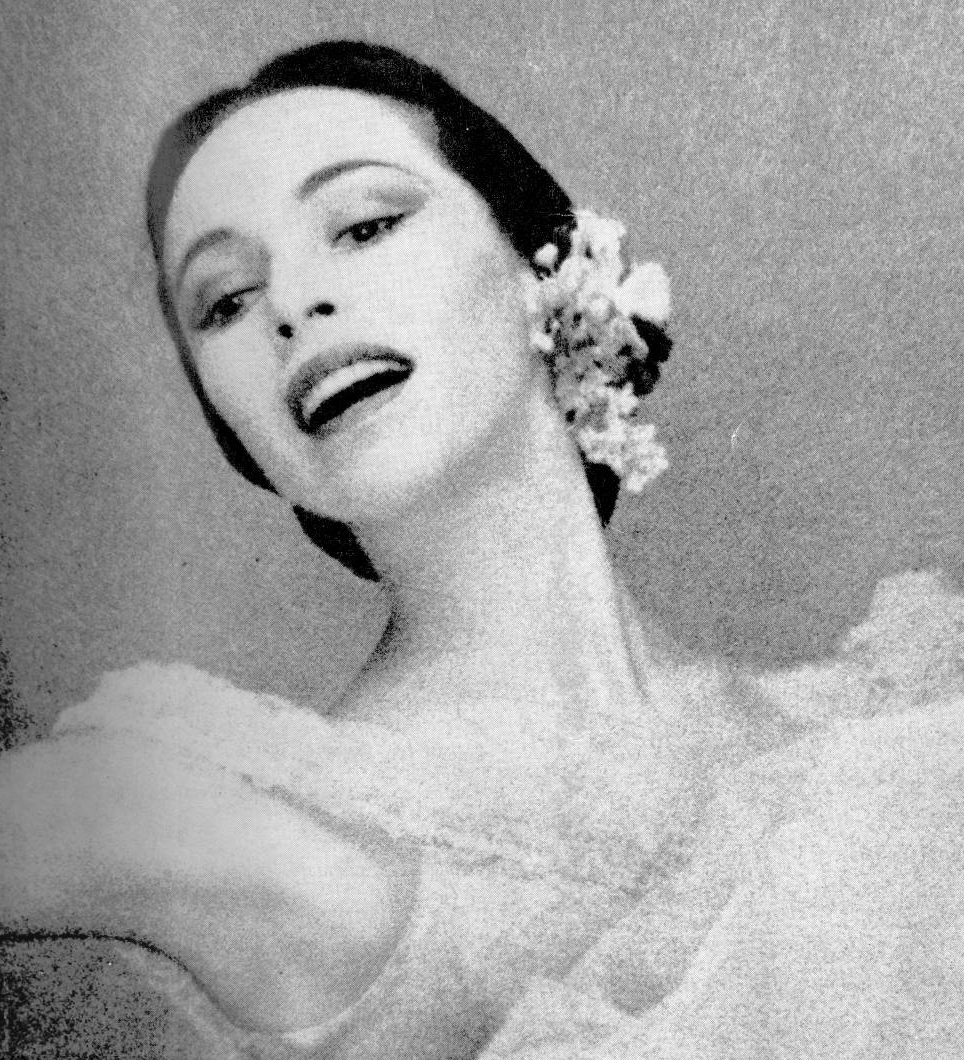
Maria Tallchief pictured on the February 1954 front cover of Dance Magazine.

Maria Tallchief, also known as Betty Marie (Osage Nation, 1925–2013) was born in Fairfax, Oklahoma. She learned the traditions of the Osage tribe from her grandmother Eliza Bigheart Tall Chief. Her great-grandfather, Peter Bigheart, was one of the people who helped make the Osage tribe wealthy, by negotiating with the US government about their oil reserves. Her parents, Alexander and Ruth Porter Tall Chief and her two siblings, Gerald and Marjorie, all moved to Los Angeles, California so the girls could get the best ballet training. Tallchief married George Balanchine, a renowned Russian choreographer and dancer, on August 16, 1946. She claims that he made her "a star in the art of ballet." In 1951, they annulled their marriage but stayed together in their choreographer-dancer relationship. Tallchief briefly married Elmourza Natirboff from 1952 to 1954 and then met and married Henry Buzz Paschen in 1956. They had one daughter, Elise Maria Paschen.

Tallchief primarily learned from Ernest Belcher until the age of 12, then studied with Madame Bronislava Nijinska and David Lichine. After graduating from High School, Tallchief moved to New York to be an apprentice for Ballet Russe de Monte Carlo. In 1942, after their Canadian tour, she became a full member in the corps de ballet. Up until this point she went by Betty Marie Tallchief, but the company wanted her to change her last name. Wanting to stay true to her Osage heritage, she changed her first name to Maria. Tallchief had leading roles in Orpheus, The Firebird, Swan Lake, and The Nutcracker, which were all choreographed by Balanchine. And her role as The Firebird started her career as a prima ballerina. In a 1954 tour with Ballet Russe made her the highest paid prima ballerina of that time. In 1947, she left Ballet Russe to help her husband, Balanchine, at the Ballet Society or today known as the New York Ballet. She retired from dancing in 1966 and moved to Chicago with her husband, Pashen. There she was the director of both of Chicago's Lyric Opera Ballet from 1973 to 1979, and Chicago City Ballet from 1980 to 1987. She stayed in Chicago until she died on April 11, 2013.

Known as Oklahoma's "Firebird," Tallchief has collected several honors and awards throughout her career. She received the Washington Press Women of the Year Award and the Annual Dance Magazine Award twice. The Oklahoma Legislature declared June 29 as Maria Tallchief day in 1953. The Osage tribe named her Princess Wa-Xthe-Thonba which mean “Woman of Two Standards." She received the Kennedy Center Honors in 1996. And she was involved in the America for Indian Opportunity and directed the Indian Council Fire Achievement Award.

=== Marjorie Tallchief ===
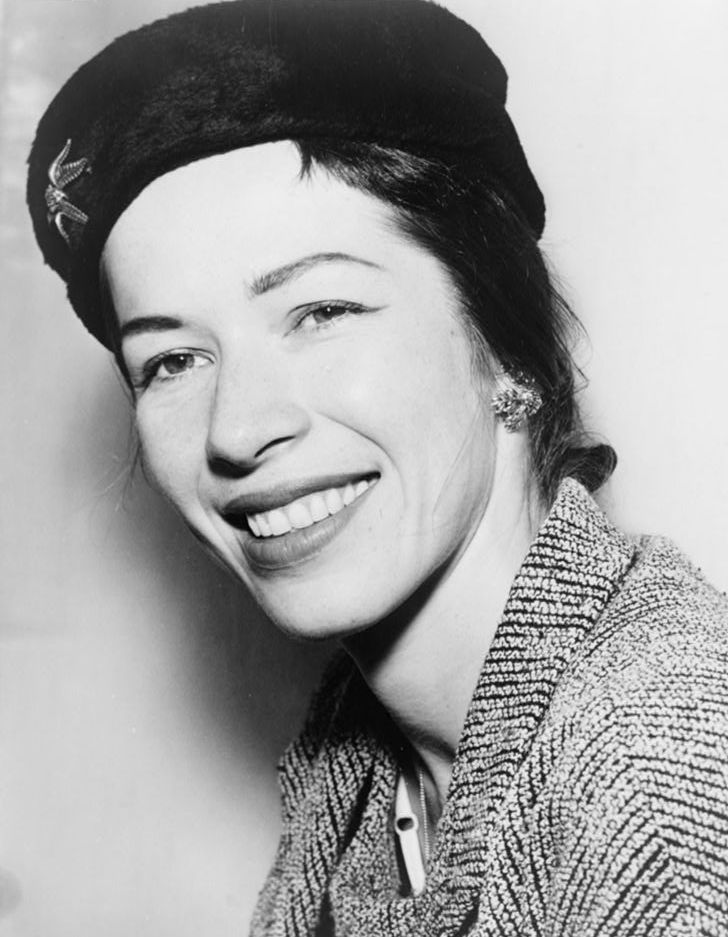
Marjorie Tallchief photographed by Herman Hiller.

Marjorie Tallchief (Osage Nation, 1926–2021) was born during a family vacation to Denver, Colorado, but grew up in Fairfax, Oklahoma. She and her sister, Maria Tallchief, moved with the family to California to pursue ballet training when they were young. She studied with Ernest Belcher, Bronislava Nijinska, and David Linchine. Tallchief married George Skibine, an artistic director and choreographer, in 1947 in Vichy, France. They had two children, Alexander and George. She resided in Florida from 1989 until her retirement in 1993.

Tallchief was in multiple companies, the American Ballet Russe de Monte Carlo from 1946 to 1947, the Grand Ballet du Marquis de Cuevas from 1948 to 1955, Ruth Page's Chicago Opera Ballet as a guest artist from 1958 to 1962, and the Harkness Ballet as a prima ballerina from 1964 to 1966. Her most famous leading roles were in Night Shadow in 1950, Annabel Lee in 1951, Idylle in 1954, Romeo and Juliet in 1955, and Giselle in 1957. She was the first American Indian to become premiere danseuse etoile in the Paris Opera. Tallchief's classical and contemporary roles made her one of the most versatile ballet dancers during the 20th century. She performed for many heads of state, the most well-known being John F. Kennedy, Charles de Gaulle, and Lyndon B. Johnson. She was also the director of several companies, such as the Civic Ballet Academy in Dallas, Texas, the City Ballet in Chicago, Illinois, and the Harid Conservatory in Boca Raton, Florida in 1989.

Tallchief received many awards and honors, including her 1991 induction into the Oklahoma Hall of Fame, and a University of Oklahoma distinguished service award in 1992.

== Artistic tributes ==
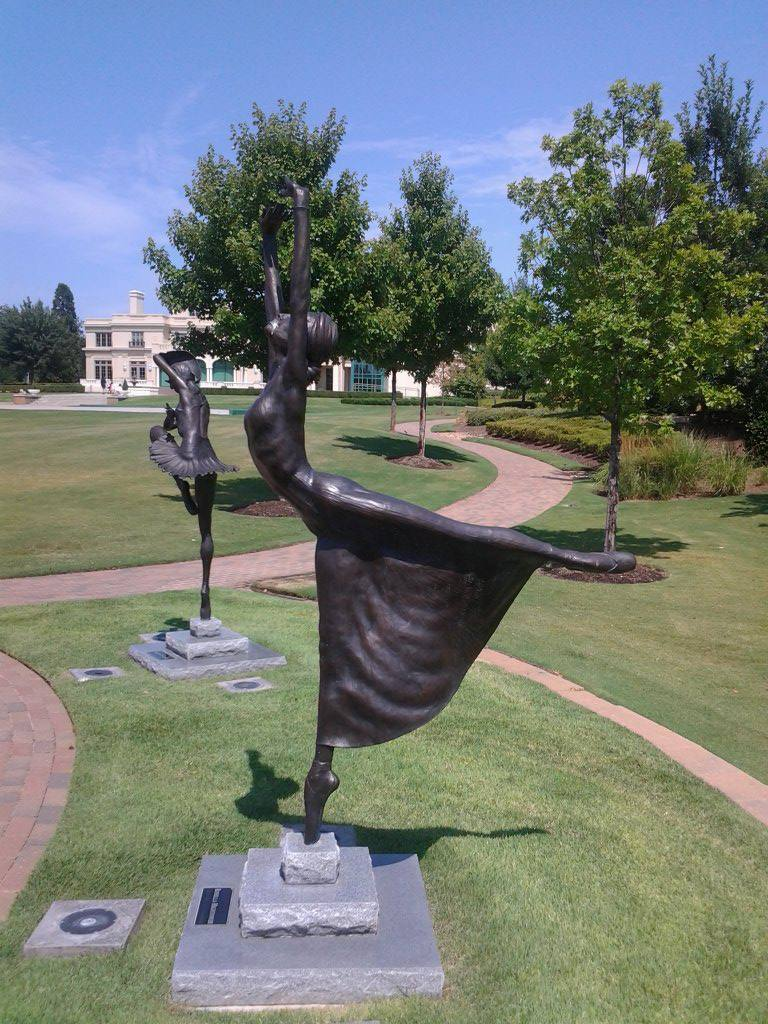
Two of the Five Moons sculptures at the Tulsa Historical Society. From left to right: Marjorie Tallchief, Rosella Hightower.

The ballerinas profound significance inspired other forms of art. A ballet entitled The Four Moons was created for the Oklahoma Indian Ballerina Festival in 1967. The ballet, set to music by the Oklahoma native Louis Ballard, a Quapaw-Cherokee composer, consists of four solos that evoke each dancer's tribal heritage. The Osage solo is dedicated to both Tallchief sisters, thus explaining The Four Moons title, as opposed to five.

Chickasaw artist Mike Larsen painted a mural depicting the Five Moons, entitled Flight of Spirit. The mural hangs in the Oklahoma State Capitol Rotunda in Oklahoma City. One of the last paintings by Muscogee Creek artist Jerome Tiger was The Four Moons, used for the cover of Louis Ballard's ballet program. The 1967 tempera and casein painting features Chouteau, Hightower, Larkin, and Marjorie Tallchief in a range of dynamic dance positions with four stylized moons, on a solid blue field.

Lili Cockerille Livingston wrote a biography of the women, entitled American Indian Ballerinas. She excluded Moscelyne Larkin Jasinski from the book upon her request.

The reverse of the 2023 Native American dollar features the prima ballerina Maria Tallchief and the Five Moons.

=== Sculpture ===
The Five Moons sculpture was unveiled at the Tulsa Historical Society in November 2007. The sculptures present each of the women in a costume and pose representative of one of their signature roles. The project was begun in 1995 by artist Monte England. England, inspired by Mike Larsen's mural, desired to create a tribute in bronze to the ballerinas in his hometown of Tulsa. Sponsorship of the project was provided by Tulsa Historical Society and the Tulsa Ballet, whose representative monitored the project to help England ensure that details such as hand position and dress were accurate. In 2005, however, England died, having completed only two of the full-sized sculptures. England's long-time friend and fellow sculptor Gary Henson was asked to complete the project. Henson was provided license by the Ballet and Historical Society to complete the remaining sculptures in his own style, which differed slightly from that of England.

On April 30, 2022, the Tulsa Historical Society reported the statue of Marjorie Tallchief missing. By Monday, May 2, the majority of the sculpture was found in pieces at two metal recycling facilities, having been sold for scrap for around $260. A GoFundMe campaign was started to restore the statue. Gary Henson, one of the sculpture’s creators, worked to restore it, including making new moulds for the parts that were never recovered. The restored statue was unveiled on 29 October 2023.
