= Sacagawea dollar =

US one dollar coin minted since 2000

- United States
- Value: 1.00 United States dollar
- Mass: 8.100 g (0.26 troy oz)
- Diameter: 26.49 mm (1.043 in)
- Thickness: 2.00 mm (0.079 in)
- Edge: Plain (2000–2008); Lettered (2009–present)
- Composition: Core: 100% Cu; Cladding: 77% Cu, 12% Zn, 7% Mn, 4% Ni; Overall: 88.5% Cu, 6% Zn, 3.5% Mn, 2% Ni
- Years of minting: 2000–2001; 2009-2011 (circulation); 2002–2008; 2012–present (collectors only)
- Mint marks: P (Philadelphia); D (Denver); S (San Francisco); W (West Point, special strikings only)

Obverse
- Design: Profile of Sacagawea with her child, Jean Baptiste Charbonneau
- Designer: Glenna Goodacre
- Design date: 2000
- Design: Date and mint mark removed
- Designer: Glenna Goodacre
- Design date: 2009

Reverse
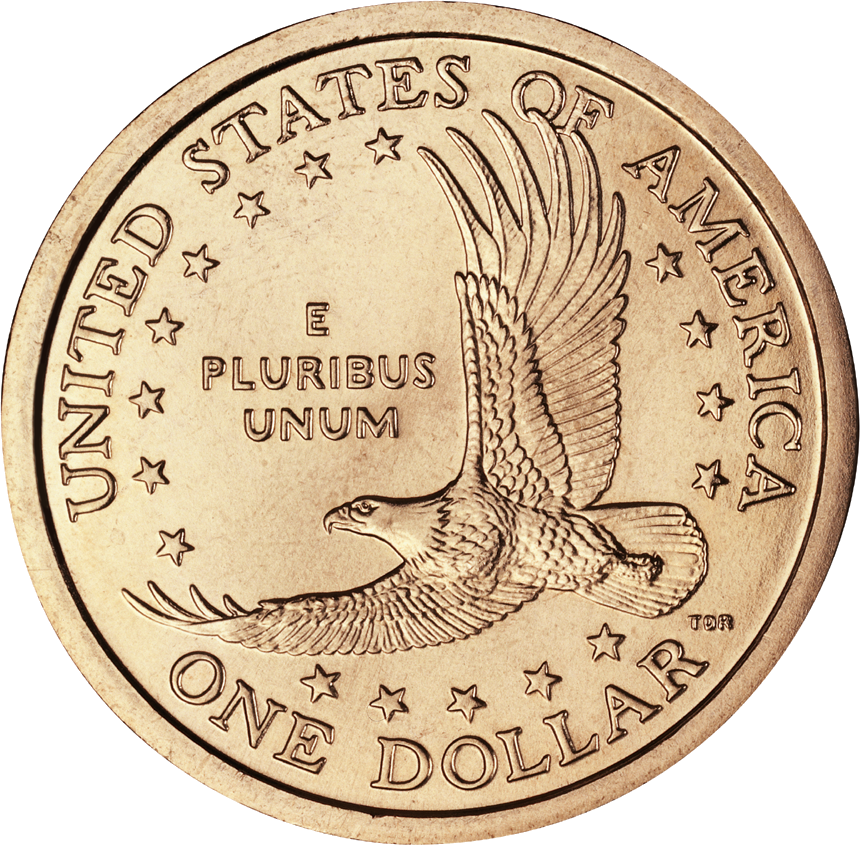
- Design: Soaring eagle
- Designer: Thomas D. Rogers
- Design date: 2000
- Design: Various; one design per year
- Designer: Various
- Design date: 2009–present

The Sacagawea dollar (also known as the "golden dollar") is a United States dollar coin introduced in 2000, but subsequently minted only for niche circulation from 2002 onward. The coin generally failed to meet consumer and business demands but it is still generally accepted in circulation.

These coins have a copper core clad by manganese brass, giving them a distinctive golden color. The coin features an obverse designed by Glenna Goodacre of Sacagawea, the Shoshone guide of the Lewis and Clark Expedition, carrying her child. From 2000 to 2008, the reverse featured an eagle design by Thomas D. Rogers. Since 2009, the reverse of the Sacagawea dollar has been changed yearly, with each design in the series depicting a different aspect of Native American cultures. These coins are marketed as "Native American dollars".

The coin was introduced as a replacement for the Susan B. Anthony dollar, which proved useful for vending machine operators and mass transit systems despite being unpopular with the public, largely due to consumers confusing them with quarters. The Statue of Liberty was originally proposed as the design subject, but Sacagawea was eventually chosen.

The new dollar coin was heavily marketed by the Mint in a series of print, radio, and television advertisements, as well as Mint partnerships with Walmart and Cheerios. However, the Sacagawea dollar did not prove popular with the public, and mintage dropped sharply in the second year of production. Production of Sacagawea dollars continued, from 2007 to 2016, in parallel with the U.S. Presidential dollars. In 2012, mintage numbers were reduced by over 90%, in line with a similar reduction for the even less popular Presidential Dollars, because of large stockpiles of unused coins from that series.

The Mint planned to issue the Sacagawea design in 22-karat gold as well, but this idea was quickly abandoned after the Mint's authority to strike the coins was questioned, and the Mint has retained ownership of the few such coins produced. Soon after initial production of the dollar, it was noticed that a few of the dollar coins were erroneously struck with the obverse of a state quarter and the normal reverse. These coins, 2000 Sacagawea dollar – Washington quarter mules, are a rare example of a genuine accidental mule coin produced by the US Mint.

== Background ==
Because of the limited circulation of the cumbersome Eisenhower dollar, it was decided in 1977 that a smaller dollar coin might see improved circulation and prove more useful to the public. On September 26, 1978, Congress approved legislation to provide for a smaller dollar coin to be minted, which would depict Susan B. Anthony, a prominent American suffragette. As mentioned, these new dollars also proved unpopular, due in large part to their similarity in size and metallic composition to the quarter-dollar. Since there was little interest in the coin as a circulating medium, most were placed in United States Mint and Federal Reserve vaults throughout the country, and mintage ceased after 1981.

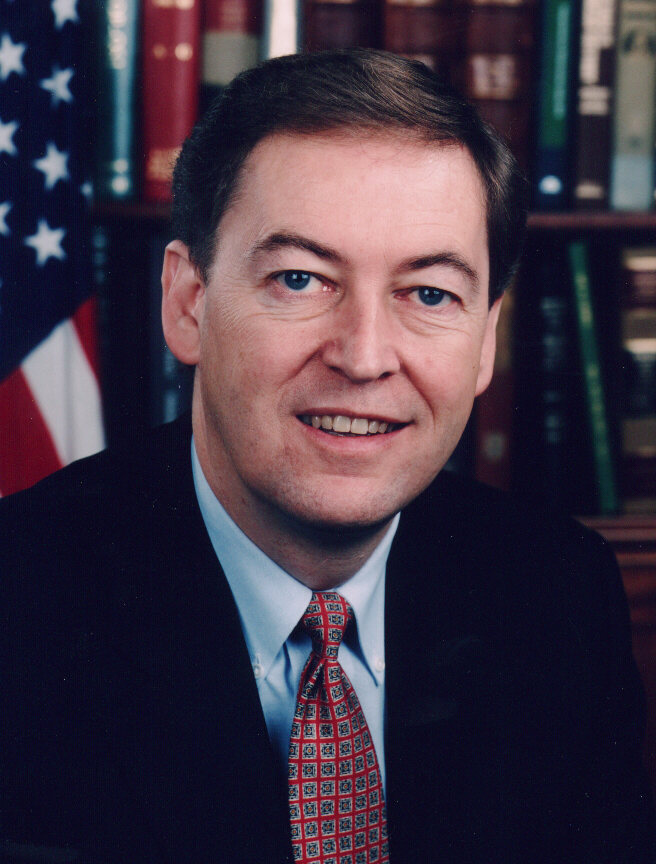
U.S. Senator Rod Grams (R-MN), who introduced legislation in the Senate for a new dollar coin

Despite their initial lack of popularity, by the mid-1990s the Treasury's supply of Anthony dollars began to dwindle due to their widespread use in vending machines (including more than 9,000 stamp machines situated in post offices across the United States) and increasing usage in mass transit systems throughout the country. Beginning in 1997, several bills were introduced to Congress with the intent of resuming mintage of small-sized dollar coins to keep up with demand. On March 20 of that year, Arizona Republican Representative Jim Kolbe introduced legislation calling for more dollar coins to be minted. Four months later, on July 24, Republican Representative Michael Castle of Delaware, a member of the House Subcommittee on Domestic and International Monetary Policy, also introduced legislation, calling for the Statue of Liberty to be the subject of the design. On October 21, Minnesota Republican Rod Grams introduced a bill in the Senate, also calling for the mintage of a newly designed dollar coin. The final legislation authorizing the design and production of a new dollar coin was based on Grams' bill. Also on October 21, in a hearing before the House Financial Services Subcommittee on Domestic and International Monetary Policy, Trade, and Technology, Treasury Department officials gave their support for a new dollar coin, recommending that it be gold-colored with a distinctive edge, to make it easily distinguishable from the quarter-dollar. During this hearing, Philip N. Diehl, then Director of the Mint, estimated that it would take thirty months to begin production of the new coin.

The United States Senate approved the necessary legislation on November 9, 1997, and the House of Representatives did the same on November 13. On December 1 President Bill Clinton signed the 50 States Commemorative Coin Program Act, which became Public Law 105–124. Section four of the act, which is entitled "United States $1 Coin Act of 1997", provided for a new dollar coin to be struck, stating in part: "The dollar coin shall be golden in color, have a distinctive edge, have tactile and visual features that make the denomination of the coin readily discernible". The act also gave authority to the Secretary of the Treasury to resume production of the Susan B. Anthony dollar to fill the demand for dollar coins until production could begin on the newly designed golden dollar. In total, more than 41 million Susan B. Anthony dollars were struck bearing the date 1999.

== Design history ==
=== Subject selection ===
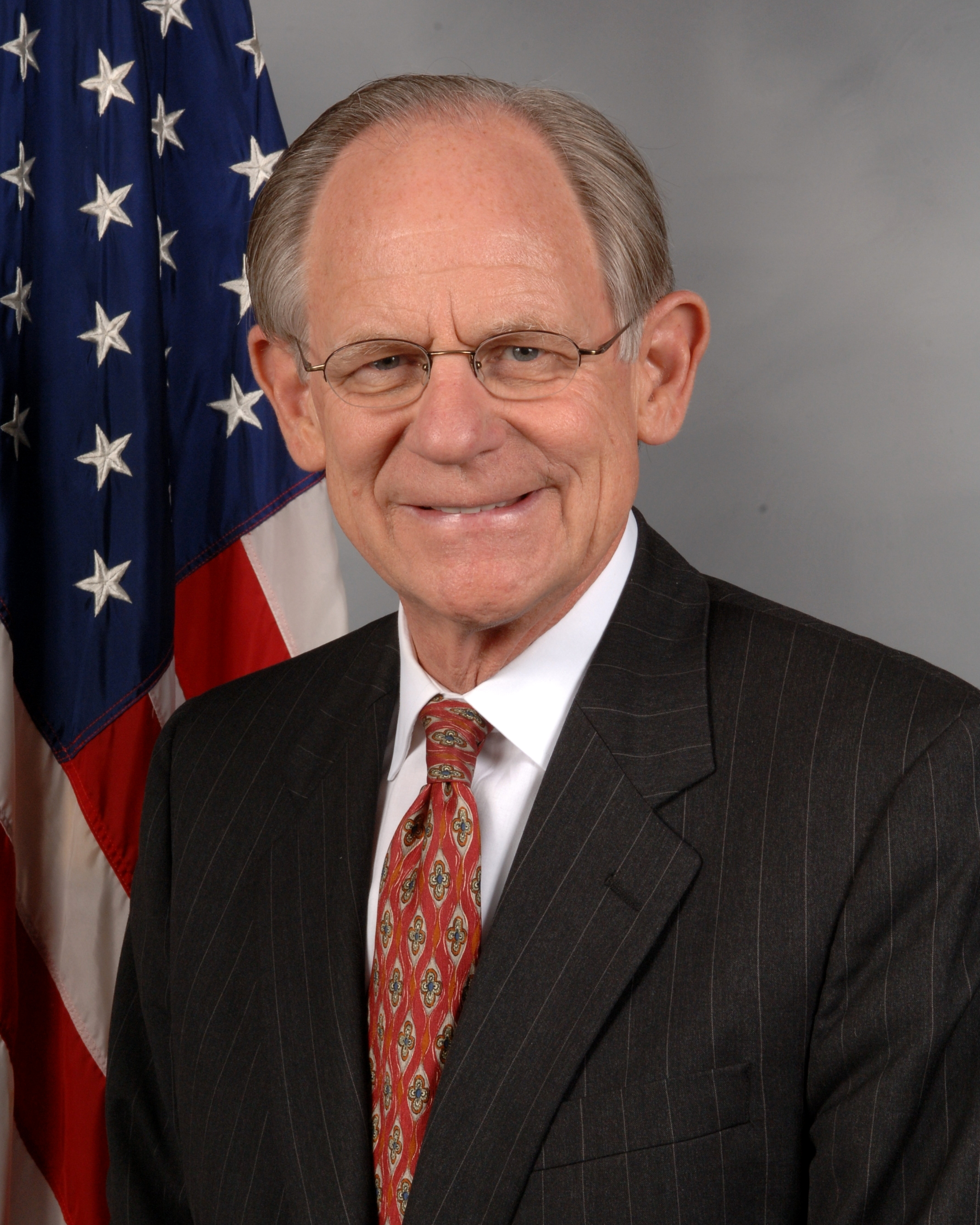
Delaware Representative Michael Castle, who preferred the more popular Statue of Liberty design to the Sacagawea for the dollar coin

Though the United States $1 Coin Act of 1997 required a change in composition and edge, it did not dictate what was to appear on the coin. To determine this, Treasury Secretary Robert Rubin appointed a nine-member Dollar Coin Design Advisory Committee. Rubin, who had the authority to select the coin's design as Secretary of the Treasury, specified that the coin should depict a representation of one or more women and could not depict a living person. The committee was chaired by Philip N. Diehl, a role that did not include a vote on the designs. They met in Philadelphia in June 1998, listening to seventeen concepts submitted by members of the public, and reviewing many more suggestions received by telephone, mail and email. On June 9, 1998, the committee recommended Sacagawea, the Shoshone guide of the Lewis and Clark Expedition, for the design of the new coin. Despite the committee's choice of Sacagawea, Castle advocated that the Statue of Liberty be depicted, as per his earlier legislation. In a letter to the House of Representatives, Castle explained his objection, stating that the "goal in creating a new dollar coin is to make it more distinctive with a popular design that would encourage its wider use by the public." Between November 18 and 22, 1998, the General Accounting Office conducted a poll on behalf of Castle. The object of the poll was to determine which design the public would find more desirable. In total, 65 percent preferred the Statue of Liberty, 27 percent preferred Sacagawea, two percent believed that either was acceptable, three percent said neither was acceptable, and an additional three percent had no opinion. Despite Castle's objection, Sacagawea was ultimately chosen as the subject of the coin.

=== Initial design selection (2000–2008) ===
Invitations were sent to 23 artists with guidelines as to what their designs should depict. The obverse was to depict a representation of Sacagawea, and the reverse an eagle symbolizing peace and freedom. Another guideline requested artists "be sensitive to cultural authenticity, and try to avoid creating a representation of a classical European face in Native American headdress." In November and December 1998, members of the Native American community, teachers, numismatists, historians, members of Congress, various government officials and others were invited by the United States Mint to review the submitted proposed designs. Six obverse and seven reverse designs were originally selected for further consideration.

After the Mint conducted a series of polls and focus groups, three obverse and four reverse designs were selected as finalists. The Mint received approximately 90,000 e-mails in reference to the design selection process. In response to the large amount of feedback generated, Diehl stated that the internet has "allowed us to conduct a public outreach program of unprecedented scope to measure opinions of the designs." All seven of the selected designs were forwarded to the United States Commission of Fine Arts; the Commission chose an obverse design depicting Sacagawea with her infant son, Jean Baptiste Charbonneau, as designed by sculptor Glenna Goodacre. Goodacre chose Randy'L He-dow Teton to model for Sacagawea, of whom there are no known contemporary portraits, to help the artist capture the features of a young Native American woman. The depiction of Sacagawea's infant son Jean Baptiste Charbonneau was partially modeled after one-year-old Adam Scholz, with assistance from his father, Peter Scholz. The infant is shown on Sacagawea's back in Hidatsa custom. The chosen reverse, designed by Mint sculptor-engraver Thomas D. Rogers, depicted a soaring eagle.

=== Native American redesign (2009–present) ===
On September 20, 2007, Pub. L. 110–82 (text) (PDF), known as the Native American $1 Coin Act, was signed by president George W. Bush. The act specified in part that the one dollar coin shall depict "images celebrating the important contributions made by Indian tribes and individual Native Americans to the development of the United States and the history of the United States." The act also called for the removal of the date from the obverse and "E PLURIBUS UNUM" from the reverse of the coin, opting instead to add them to the edge. At this time the mintmark was also moved to the edge.

The program requires that the reverse of the dollar depict a new design every year. In order to determine which design to depict on the coins, officials from the United States Senate Committee on Indian Affairs, the Native American Caucus and the National Congress of American Indians, the consulting organizations for the program, appoint a liaison to the United States Mint. Between twelve and fifteen themes are selected after consultation with the National Museum of the American Indian and the Smithsonian Institution. At this point, the consulting organizations supply the Mint with written comments regarding the themes. The suggestions are then sent to the Citizens Coinage Advisory Committee, where a theme is recommended. After reviewing the recommendations and input from the contributing organizations, the selected theme is finalized, at which point designs are produced that represent the theme. Once designs are created, the consulting organizations and the National Museum of the Native American are consulted, and the designs are sent to the Citizens Coinage Advisory Committee for approval. Based on all comments and recommendations received, the Mint selects a final design that is recommended to the Secretary of the Treasury for approval.

Edge lettering, 2009–present ✭ ✭ ✭ E PLURIBUS UNUM ✭ ✭ ✭ ✭ ✭ ✭ ✭ ✭ ✭ ✭ (date) (mint mark)

==== Designs by year ====
Year	Theme	Design	Design description	Artist(s)		Ref.
Year	Theme	Design	Design description	Designer	Sculptor	Ref.
2009	Three Sisters		A Native American woman planting seeds in a field populated with corn, beans and squash. Above the woman is the inscription "UNITED STATES OF AMERICA", and below is "$1".	Norman E. Nemeth	Norman E. Nemeth	
2010	Great Law of Peace		The Hiawatha Belt surrounding five stone-tipped arrows, along with the inscriptions "UNITED STATES OF AMERICA", "$1", "HAUDENOSAUNEE" and "GREAT LAW OF PEACE".	Thomas Cleveland	Charles Vickers	
2011	Wampanoag Treaty		The hands of the Supreme Sachem Ousamequin and Plymouth Colony Governor John Carver holding a ceremonial pipe, along with the inscriptions "UNITED STATES OF AMERICA", "$1", and "WAMPANOAG TREATY 1621".	Richard Alan Masters	Joseph Menna	
2012	Trade Routes of the 17th Century		The profile of a Native American man and a horse in the foreground and a group of galloping horses in the background.	Thomas Cleveland	Phebe Hemphill	
2013	Treaty with the Delawares		A turkey, a howling wolf, and a turtle—symbols of the Lenape—with a ring of 13 stars representing the Thirteen Colonies.	Susan Gamble	Phebe Hemphill	
2014	Native Hospitality		A Native American man clasping a ceremonial pipe while his wife holds a plate of provisions, including fish, corn, roots and gourds. In the background is the stylized image of the face of William Clark's compass, displaying "NW" for "northwest". It bears the inscriptions "UNITED STATES OF AMERICA" and "$1".	Chris Costello	Joseph Menna	
2015	Mohawk Ironworkers		A Mohawk ironworker reaching for an I-beam with the New York City skyline in the background and rivets along the left and right sides, along with the inscriptions "UNITED STATES OF AMERICA", "$1", and "MOHAWK IRONWORKERS".	Ronald D. Sanders	Phebe Hemphill	
2016	Code Talkers		Two helmets used by American fighting forces in the 20th century—the Brodie helmet of World War I, and the M1 helmet of World War II—along with two feathers which combine to form a V and the inscriptions "UNITED STATES OF AMERICA", "$1", "WWI" and "WWII".	Thomas D. Rogers	Renata Gordon	
2017	Sequoyah		A profile of Sequoyah writing "Sequoyah from Cherokee Nation" in Cherokee syllabary along the border. Other inscriptions read "SEQUOYAH", "UNITED STATES OF AMERICA", and "$1".	Chris Costello	Charles Vickers	
2018	Jim Thorpe		Jim Thorpe, with depictions of him as a football player and Olympian in the foreground, along with the inscriptions "JIM THORPE", "WA-THO-HUK", "UNITED STATES OF AMERICA", and "$1".	Michael Gaudioso	Michael Gaudioso	
2019	American Indians in Space		NASA engineer Mary Golda Ross alongside an astronaut representing John Herrington performing a space walk and an Atlas-Agena rocket with an equation in the exhaust cloud; in the field are stars. The inscriptions read "UNITED STATES OF AMERICA" and "$1".	Emily Damstra	Joseph Menna	
2020	Elizabeth Peratrovich and Alaska's Anti-Discrimination Law		Alaskan civil rights advocate and member of the Tlingit Nation Elizabeth Peratrovich	Phebe Hemphill	Phebe Hemphill	
2021	American Indians in the U.S. Military		Two eagle feathers and five stars for the five branches of the U.S. military.	Donna Weaver	Joseph Menna	
2022	Ely S. Parker		Ely S. Parker in an Army uniform with a book and quill with his signature in the field alongside the inscriptions "TONAWANDA SENECA" and "HA-SA-NO-AN-DA". The inscriptions around the design read "UNITED STATES OF AMERICA" and "$1".	Paul C. Balan	Joseph Menna	
2023	Maria Tallchief and American Indians in Ballet		Maria Tallchief in a ballet pose alongside four other dancers representing Marjorie Tallchief, Yvonne Chouteau, Rosella Hightower, and Moscelyne Larkin with a lunar motif. Inscriptions read "MARIA TALLCHIEF", "AMERICAN INDIANS IN BALLET", "UNITED STATES OF AMERICA", and "$1".	Benjamin Sowards	Phebe Hemphill	
2024	Indian Citizenship Act of 1924		An eagle staff with an American flag along with the inscriptions "INDIAN CITIZENSHIP ACT OF 1924", "UNITED STATES OF AMERICA", and "$1".	Phebe Hemphill	Phebe Hemphill	
2025	Mary Kawena Pukui		Mary Kawena Pukui wearing an aloha print mu'umu'u, a kukui nut lei, and a hibiscus flower with stylized water elements in the background, along with the inscriptions "Nānā I Ke Kumu", "UNITED STATES OF AMERICA", and "$1".	Phebe Hemphill	Phebe Hemphill	
2026	Oneida Indian Nation at Valley Forge		Polly Cooper sharing corn with George Washington holding his hat, along with the inscriptions "UNITED STATES OF AMERICA" and "POLLY COOPER" above, and "$1" and "ONEIDA ALLIES AT VALLEY FORGE" below.	Beth Zaiken	Craig Campbell	
2027	Susan La Flesche Picotte					

== Production and release ==
After her obverse design was approved, Goodacre visited the Philadelphia Mint engraving department six times in order to finalize the designs. Rogers' reverse design was also modified before production began. In his original proposal, mountainous scenery was depicted beneath the flying eagle; this was removed and the positions of other reverse design features were altered before Rubin gave final approval. Nordic gold was one alloy considered in 1998 for the coin. Ultimately, the composition selected for the new coin included a cladding of manganese brass (containing about 77% copper, 12% zinc, 7% manganese, and 4% nickel) over a pure copper core. This composition was chosen because it would give the coin a distinctive golden color, and would also be electromagnetically identical to its predecessor, the cupronickel Susan B. Anthony dollar, for coin acceptors. The first official striking of the Sacagawea dollar took place on November 18, 1999, during a ceremony in which dignitaries and other invited guests each struck individual examples of the coins. Because the coins were struck before 2000, it was not legal to release them during the first strike ceremonies. Instead, the coins were saved and later sent to the dignitaries who struck them. Full-scale production began shortly after the ceremonial strikings.

For her work creating the obverse of the Sacagawea dollar, Goodacre received a $5,000 commission; she requested that it be paid in dollar coins. The 2000-P dollars paid to Goodacre were struck on specially burnished blanks to give them a finish unique to that striking. Diehl and other Mint dignitaries personally delivered the coins to Goodacre on April 5, 2000. A similar specially burnished finish was used on the 75,000 2000-D dollars included in the Millennium Coin & Currency sets. Soon after release of the new coins, it was discovered that they tarnished quickly once in circulation. In April 2001 the Mint began testing an experimental rinse that would inhibit the tarnishing; however, the rinse was used only in that year.

=== Marketing ===
The act authorizing the dollar coin also provided for the Secretary of the Treasury to "adopt a program to promote the use of such coins by commercial enterprises, mass transit authorities, and Federal, State, and local government agencies." The Mint's initial advertising campaign, consisting of an estimated 1,600 television, radio and print advertisements and partnerships with the national retail chain Wal-Mart and the General Mills company, cost approximately $41 million. The television ads consisted of the head of George Washington superimposed upon a body, voiced by actor Michael Keaton, discussing the merits of the new dollar coin.

Beginning in January 2000, the Mint began sending dollar coins to Wal-Mart and Sam's Club stores across the United States in order to help promote and circulate the coins. In total, $100 million worth of the dollars were shipped to the stores as part of the promotion. Some store owners criticized the Mint's partnership with Wal-Mart and Sam's Club as being unfair to smaller retailers. In response, Diehl noted that "every retailer and commercial establishment has the right to carry the Golden Dollar. The Mint's agreement with Wal-Mart is designed to encourage all retailers and commercial businesses in the nation to use the new Golden Dollar in everyday transactions."

The first Sacagawea dollar coins were released to the public on January 27, 2000. A Zions Bank branch in Blackfoot, Idaho (near Sacagawea's birthplace) was chosen by the Mint to distribute the first 2,000 coins. However, the shipment of coins did not arrive there in time, and Wal-Mart began giving out Sacagawea dollars in change that same afternoon.

During this time, the Mint began a partnership with the General Mills company, in which 10,000,000 boxes of Cheerios cereal would contain a 2000-dated Lincoln cent as a prize, one in every 2,000 boxes would contain a new Sacagawea dollar and one in every 4,400 would hold a certificate redeemable for 100 Sacagawea dollars. It was later discovered, and confirmed in 2005, that the dollars included in every 2,000 boxes were in fact early strikes, differing from those ultimately issued for circulation by the number of tail feathers on the eagle. Approximately 5,500 of the coins were included in the boxes of cereal. Far less of these dollars are known, since many may have been spent and entered circulation. Later analysis also showed that an unknown number of them had the normal "Reverse of 2000" rather than what collectors called the enhanced tail feathers "Reverse of 1999". Thus the fact that a coin came from the cereal box does not guarantee that it is the rare variety.

=== Gold dollars ===
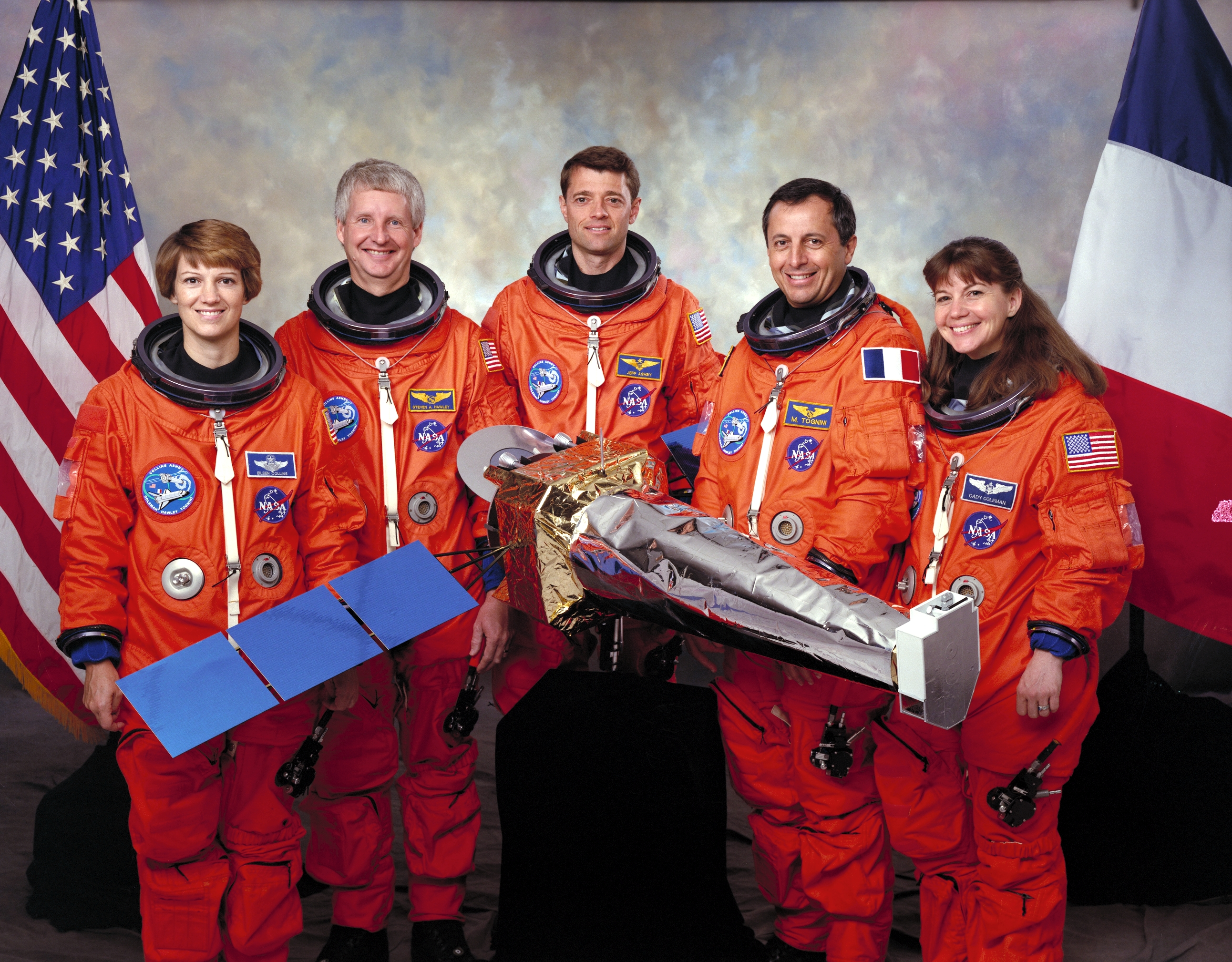
The crew of the Space Shuttle Columbia for STS-93, the mission during which twelve gold Sacagawea dollars were sent into space

In 1999, the Mint struck a number of Sacagawea dollars in .9167 fine (22-karat) gold. During the initial production of the coins, they were denominated at five dollars in order to help the public distinguish them from their circulating counterparts. The plan was to sell gold versions of the coins to collectors. On March 20, this plan was halted when some Congressmen questioned the authority of Mint officials to strike the coins in a composition different from what had already been authorized. Full-scale coin production never took place even though the Mint maintained that it did have authority to do so, as the coins would be considered numismatic items and not regular-issue coins. Similar gold coins were also struck, this time bearing the denomination of one dollar and a "W" mint mark of the West Point Mint (although they were actually struck at Philadelphia). In total, 39 such coins were struck, twelve of which were found to be of adequate quality, while the rest were eventually destroyed. Unlike those denominated at five dollars, the one dollar pieces were "struck to commemorate the historic flight of the Space Shuttle Columbia in July 1999", according to Former Mint Director Ed Moy. The twelve surviving gold dollars were sent into space aboard Columbia on mission STS-93 in July 1999. Following the return of the shuttle, the coins were placed in storage at Fort Knox, where they remained until 2007, when they were exhibited at the American Numismatic Association World's Fair of Money in Milwaukee, Wisconsin. After the event, the coins were returned to Fort Knox. In 2025, Stack's Bowers sold seven of the space-flown coins, along with an eighth unflown example, at auction for $3.28 million. At the same time, to celebrate the coin's 25th anniversary, a 24-karat gold version was struck at the West Point Mint. The coin was released on July 31, and the entire mintage of 7,500 sold out soon after.

=== Mule error ===
In May 2000, an error coin bearing the George Washington obverse design of a U.S. state quarter and the eagle reverse of a Sacagawea dollar was discovered in a roll of dollar coins purchased from a bank in Mountain Home, Arkansas. The undated coin, known as a double-denomination mule, was the first of eleven discovered and authenticated. Mint officials estimate that the coins, which bear the 'P' mint mark for Philadelphia, were struck from late April to early May 2000. They were produced on dollar-coin planchets clad with manganese bronze, not quarter planchets with copper-nickel cladding.

Following the initial discovery, a bin containing several thousand of the error coins was impounded at the Philadelphia Mint, and all such coins within it were ordered melted. Some of the coins that had been released were eventually tracked back to a coin-wrapping facility near Philadelphia. Employees at the wrapping facility were instructed to watch for any of the coins; those discovered were turned over to the Mint.

A subsequent federal investigation into the incident found that the error coins had been struck accidentally, but two former Mint employees were guilty of selling some of the dollars, resulting in imprisonment and fines for both individuals. In 2002, Mint officials announced that two of the ten coins then reported had entered circulation through legal channels, but the other eight were of dubious origins and might be seized. However, as of 2011, the federal government has not attempted to seize the eight examples considered of dubious origin.

As of August 2011, eight of the eleven error coins, including the one initially discovered in Arkansas, are owned by a New Mexico collector who purchased them between 2000 and 2003, paying as high as $75,000 for a single specimen. Of the other three documented mules, one is owned by its discoverer, a Missouri collector, another was purchased by an unnamed collector, and the third, first reported in 2011, was purchased in 2011 by a Chicago dealer from an individual who had owned the coin for about ten years. Sale prices as high as $200,000 have been reported. Three different die combinations have been identified among the eleven available error coins.

== Reception ==
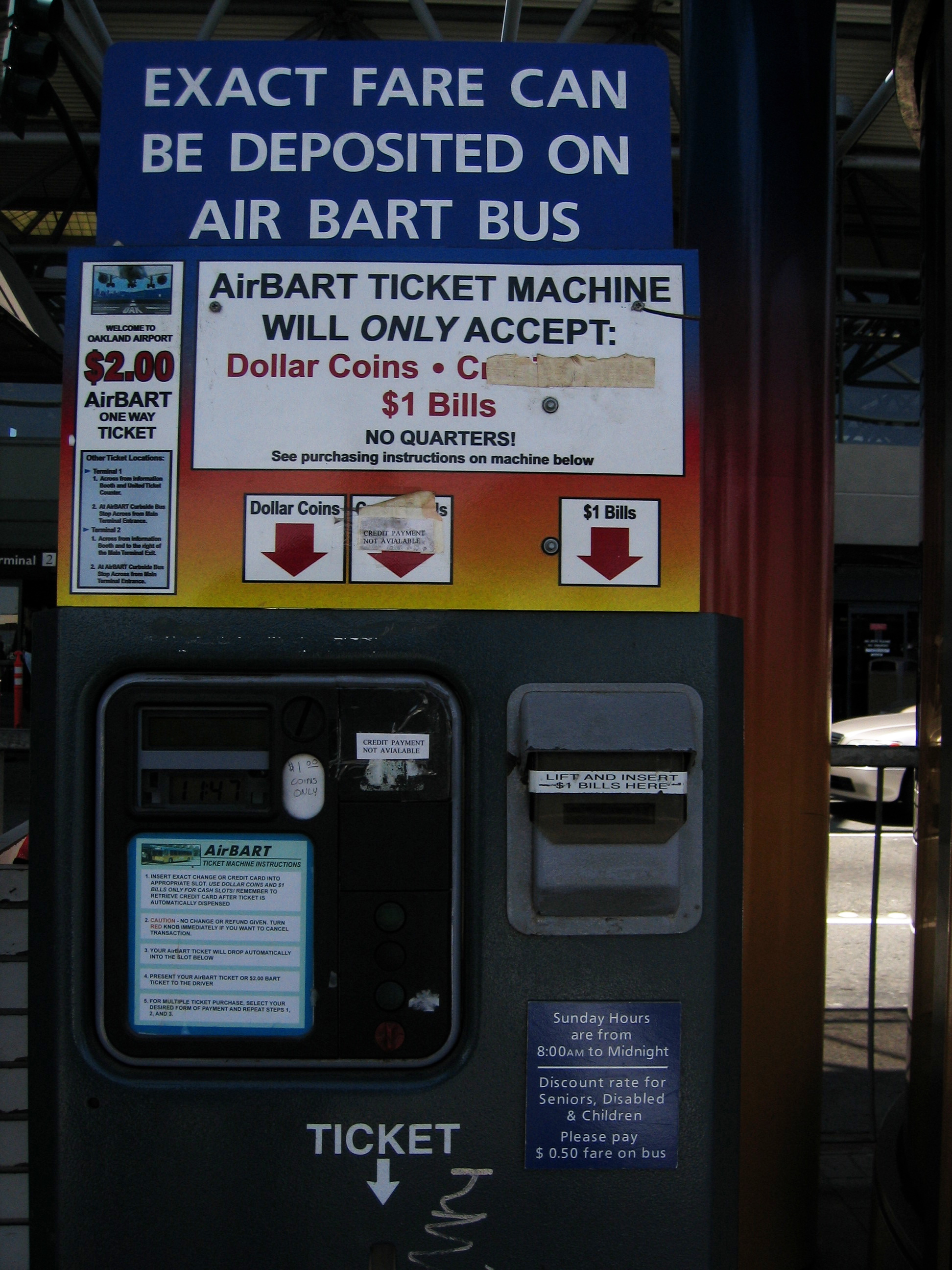
An AirBART ticket machine that accepts only dollar coins and dollar bills

The coin received mixed reviews from the nation's senators. In an interview with Associated Press columnist Suzanne Gamboa, Republican Senator Phil Gramm of Texas described United States currency as "crummy". Gramm, who was one of the senators who voted for the bill containing the legislation that authorized it, praised the design of the Sacagawea dollar as being an improvement over the other coin designs then in production. Despite his praise of the design, Gramm condemned the Mint's approach to marketing the coin, stating that if the United States Mint were the Franklin Mint, they would be "sued for deceptive advertisement." He also noted his belief that the Mint had repeated the earlier mistakes of the Susan B. Anthony dollar by issuing a coin that was tailored to the requests of the vending machine industry rather than the average consumer.

Texas Republican Senator Kay Bailey Hutchison criticized both the Sacagawea design as well the coin's size in relation to the other coins in circulation at the time. Hutchison felt that the new coin lacked the necessary heft to easily distinguish it from the lower denominations, and that the dollar, as well as the other coins and currency then in circulation "looks like play money".

Senators Mike DeWine of Ohio and Byron Dorgan of North Dakota, Republican and Democrat respectively, praised the design and the distinctiveness of the golden color.

The series proved unpopular in everyday commerce. Mintage dropped by 90% the following year. From 2002 through 2008, Sacagawea dollars were only struck for sale to collectors. The Federal Reserve Bank ordered none of the Native American series after their issuance beginning in 2009. In December 2009, it was noted by a Federal Reserve official that there were currently 857,000,000 dollar coins (including Presidential dollars) in government storage vaults, an amount estimated to satisfy the demand for twelve years. In January 2009, the Mint created a direct ship program allowing private individuals to purchase boxes of coins with credit cards, allowing them to earn frequent flyer miles in the process. The Mint subsequently restricted sales to large purchasers later in 2009, and ended credit card sales completely in July 2011.

In 2009, with the introduction of the Native American reverse designs, the coins were re-introduced to circulation; however, they again proved unpopular in commerce and following the 2011 issue, treasury secretary Timothy F. Geithner announced that all future dollar coin production would be for numismatic (collecting) purposes only.

Despite their unpopularity in the United States, the coins are popular for commerce in El Salvador and Ecuador, nations that use the United States dollar. Coins are more durable in tropical climates, and Sacagawea's portrait resembles that of an Ecuadorian Indian woman.

== Mintage figures ==
Year	Philadelphia mintage	Denver mintage	San Francisco mintage	Total minted
2000	767,150,500	518,916,000	4,047,904	1,290,114,404
2001	62,468,000	70,939,500	3,183,740	136,591,240
2002	3,865,610	3,732,000	3,211,995	10,809,605
2003	3,080,000	3,080,000	3,298,439	9,458,439
2004	2,660,000	2,660,000	2,965,422	8,285,422
2005	2,520,000	2,520,000	3,344,679	8,384,679
2006	4,900,000	2,800,000	3,054,436	10,754,436
2007	3,640,000	3,920,000	2,259,847	9,819,847
2008	1,820,000	1,820,000	1,998,108	5,638,108
2009	37,380,000	33,880,000	2,179,867	73,439,867
2010	32,060,000	48,720,000	1,689,216	82,469,216
2011	29,400,000	48,160,000	1,673,010	79,233,010
2012	2,800,000	3,080,000	1,189,445	7,069,445
2013	1,820,000	1,820,000	802,460	4,442,460
2014	3,080,000	5,600,000	1,144,190	9,345,100
2015	2,800,000	2,240,000	1,050,166	6,090,166
2016	2,100,000	2,800,000	923,414	5,823,414
2017	3,020,736	2,737,136	878,306	3,848,460
2018	1,400,000	1,400,000	517,081	3,317,081
2019	1,400,000	1,540,000	1,012,931	3,952,931
2020	1,400,000	1,260,000	464,658	3,124,658
2021	1,260,000	1,260,000	512,664	3,032,664
2022	980,000	980,000	399,950	2,359,950

== Special finish sets ==
Besides the annual proof and uncirculated sets, Sacagawea dollars with special finishes have also been inserted into several mint packages. These include the following:

Year and Mint	Product	Mintage
2000-D	Millennium Coinage & Currency Set with special Burnished finish	75,000
2014-D	Coin and Currency Set with Enhanced Uncirculated finish	50,000
2015-W	Coin and Currency Set with Enhanced Uncirculated finish	90,000
2016-S	Coin and Currency Set with Enhanced Uncirculated finish	75,000
2017-S	Enhanced Uncirculated Mint set	225,000
2019-P	Coin and Currency Set with Enhanced Uncirculated finish	50,000

== See also ==
- 50 State quarters
- America the Beautiful silver bullion coins
- District of Columbia and United States Territories quarters
- America the Beautiful quarters
- Presidential dollar coins
- Westward Journey nickel series
- United States Bicentennial coinage

Preceded by Susan B. Anthony dollar	Dollar coin of the United States (2000–present); With: Presidential Dollar Coin Program (2007–2016; 2020); American Innovation $1 Coin Program (2018–present)	Succeeded by Incumbent
