= The Ballerina (sculpture) =

Sculpture in Oklahoma City, Oklahoma, U.S.

- The sculpture in 2019
- Artist: Mike Larsen
- Year: 2007
- Medium: Bronze sculpture
- Subject: Ballet dancer
- Location: Oklahoma City, Oklahoma, U.S.; 35°28′09″N 97°31′23″W

The Ballerina is a 9-foot (2.7 m) bronze sculpture by Mike Larsen, installed in Oklahoma City's Civic Center Music Hall, in the U.S. state of Oklahoma. The statue commemorates the legacy of Yvonne Chouteau, Rosella Hightower, Moscelyne Larkin, Majorie Tallchief, and Maria Tallchief, five Native American women ballet dancers named "Oklahoma's treasures" by former Governor Frank Keating. The sculpture was unveiled in 2007.

== See also ==
- 2007 in art
- Five Moons
