= Dominique Bagouet =

French choreographer and dancer (1951–1992)

- Born: July 9, 1951; Angoulême, France
- Died: December 9, 1992 (aged 41); Montpellier, France
- Education: École Supérieure de Danse de Cannes Rosella Hightower, Performing Arts Research and Training Studios
- Occupations: Choreographer and dancer
- Years active: 1976–1992
- Career
- Former groups: Maurice Béjart, Carolyn Carlson, Peter Gross, Merce Cunningham, Trisha Brown, and Lar Lubovitch
- Dances: Chansons de nuit, Déserts d'amour, Le Crawl de Lucien, Assaï, Le Saut de l'ange, So Schnell, Necesito, Fantaisa semplice,

Dominique Bagouet (9 July 1951 – 9 December 1992) was a French choreographer and dancer. He was an influential figure in French contemporary dance.

== Biography ==
Dominique Bagouet began training in classical dance in Cannes at the school of Rosella Hightower, and obtained his first engagements at the Ballet du Grand Théâtre de Genève directed by Alfonso Cata, where he danced the Balanchine repertoire. After a period as a dancer with Félix Blaska, then with Maurice Béjart in Brussels, Bagouet discovered the teaching of Carolyn Carlson at the Paris Opera. It was there that Bogouet joined Chandre, a group of former Mudra dancers. He also learned of another dancer, Peter Goss's, teachings while at the Paris Opera.

In 1974, he left for the United States where he acquired the techniques of Martha Graham and José Limón before tackling postmodern dance with Merce Cunningham, Trisha Brown and Lar Lubovitch, among others.

Dominique returned to France in 1976, presenting his first choreography, Chansons de nuit (Songs of the Night), at the Bagnolet International Choreographic Competition. For his performance, Dominique won first prize for his choreography. After winning the Bagnolet competition, Demoniqiue founded his own dance company, named the Dominique Bagouet company, and moved to Montpellier. It was there that he became the director of the first regional choreographic centers, later renamed National Center for Choreography in 1984.

Dominique Bagouet died of AIDS-related complications in 1992, just as he was about to begin rehearsals for Noces d'or (Golden Wedding), in honor of his parents' 50th wedding anniversary. Because of his passing, the piece was never completed. In 2006, Marie-Hélène Rebois directed a documentary film that gave a portrait of Bagouet and presented what he envisioned for his ultimate work.

The story of a posthumous performance of his play Jours étranges opens the tribute play Les Idoles by Christophe Honoré.

Dominique Bagouet is buried in the Bardines cemetery in Angoulême.
