= Monique Loudières =

French ballet dancer and teacher (born 1956)

Monique Loudières (born 15 April 1956) is a French ballet dancer and teacher. A member of the Paris Opera Ballet from 1967, she received the status of principal dancer in 1982. After retiring from the stage in 1996, she continued to accept invitations until 2010. From 2001 to 2008, she was artistic director at the École supérieure de danse de Cannes Rosella Hightower.

== Early life and education ==
Born in Choisy-le-Roi, a suburb of Paris, Loudières had enjoyed music from an early age but it was her doctor who recommended she should take up ballet, given her rather fragile constitution. After studying for five years at the Paris Opera Ballet School (1967–1972), she was admitted to the Paris Opera at the age of 16.

== Career ==
When she was 19, she danced her first solos in L'Oiseau bleu, Michel Fokine's Le Spectre de la Rose and Paul Taylor's Aureole. Between the age of 13 to 26, Loudières was mentored by Yves Brieux who gave her an understanding of theater, stage, and the idea of projection. George Balanchine and Jerome Robbins helped her develop musicality as well as her breathing technique.

After she had danced Kitri in Rudolf Nureyev's Don Quixote, the artistic director Rosella Hightower elevated her to étoile in 1982. She went on to dance the roles of dramatic heroines in Giselle, Romeo and Juliet (Prokofiev) and Onegin. She also danced roles in the ballets of contemporary choreographers including Balanchine, Maurice Béjart, and John Neumeier. She has also worked with Alvin Ailey, Mats Ek, William Forsythe, Martha Graham, Jiří Kylián, Serge Lifar, Kenneth MacMillan, Roland Petit, Paul Taylor, and Twyla Tharp. She created roles in ballets choreographed by Nureyev: Black and Blue, Washington Square and La Dansomanie. Loudière danced as a guest around the globe in performances of the Boston Ballet, Tokyo Ballet, La Scala, The Royal Ballet, Stuttgart Ballet, Teatro Colón and at the Havana Ballet Festival. In 1993, she was awarded the Grand Prix National de la Danse and was decorated in 1996 as a Commandeur des Arts et Lettres.

== Retirement ==
After retiring from the stage in 1996, she continued to accept invitations until 2010. She has sought balance between work and family life, being married with two children. Loudière has taught dance since the age of 30. From 2001 to 2008, she was the Artistic and Pedagogical Director at the École supérieure de danse de Cannes Rosella Hightower.
