= Oklahoma City Ballet =

U.S. Ballet Company

General information
- Name: Oklahoma City Ballet
- Previous names: Oklahoma Civic City Ballet; Ballet Oklahoma
- Founders: Yvonne Chouteau; Miguel Terekhov
- Principal venue: Civic Center Music Hall

Senior staff
- Executive Director: Dana McCrory

Artistic staff
- Artistic Director: Ryan Jolicoeur-Nye

Other
- Orchestra: Oklahoma City Philharmonic
- Official school: The Oklahoma City Ballet Yvonne Chouteau School - Racheal Nye, Director

The Oklahoma City Ballet is a professional dance company and school located in Oklahoma City. The company began under the artistic direction of Ballet Russe de Monte Carlo dancers Yvonne Chouteau and Miguel Terekhov in the Science and Arts Foundation building on the Oklahoma City Fairgrounds.

Founded in 1963, Oklahoma City Ballet has been the city's professional ballet company for over 40 years. It is the resident dance company of the Civic Center Music Hall and as of 2019 has 30 dancers from around the world. Led by Artistic Director Ryan Jolicoeur-Nye, the company produces 5 main stage productions per season in Oklahoma City and tours across Oklahoma and the surrounding states. The Oklahoma City Ballet also participates in a number of community outreach projects designed to provide dance education and experience throughout central Oklahoma.

== History ==
The company began in 1963 under the name Oklahoma City Civic Ballet, brought together by the foundation's civic ballet committee and chief benefactors, Mr. and Mrs. John E. Kirkpatrick.

The Oklahoma City Ballet Society was incorporated in 1967 to support the company. That same year the Ballet joined the newly formed Arts Council of Oklahoma City and performed in the first Festival of the Arts, celebrating Oklahoma's 60th year of statehood.

In 1970, the Board of Trustees formed a new group, Oklahoma City Metropolitan Ballet Society and with the generous support of Vernon Pellow, Sr. The company began as the Oklahoma City Metropolitan Ballet with Yvonne Chouteau staying on as founding artistic director. Ballerina and Oklahoma native Maria Tallchief worked together with Ms. Chouteau to audition dancers for the company.

Yvonne Chouteau was succeeded by New York City Ballet principal dancers Conrad and Joy Ludlow, who directed the company from 1973 to 1979. The Ludlow's founded the company's affiliate school and joined Oklahoma City's Allied Arts organization. During this time the Company and School used studios on the campus of Oklahoma City University and performed at the Kirkpatrick Theater also on the OCU campus.

In 1979, American Ballet Theatre dancers Bojan Spassoff and Stephanie Wolf-Spassoff assumed direction of the company. This was the beginning of the change from a civic company to a semi-professional company which was now performing three productions plus The Nutcracker in a season. In 1980, the company name was changed to Ballet Oklahoma and in the spring of 1981 the company moved into a newly renovated facility. The building was donated by Robert Hefner, III and a campaign to raise funds for renovations was chaired by Ann Simmons Alspaugh. Rand Elliott provided the architectural design and the renovations were completed by Bill McNatt Construction.

In 1983, New York City Ballet dancer Edward Villella joined the company as artistic director and directed the company for three seasons, bringing the work of George Balanchine into the repertory. In 1986, Dallas Ballet dancers Bryan Pitts and Laura Flagg-Pitts joined the company as artistic director and assistant to the director respectively. During the Pitts’ tenure, the company instituted its annual Artsreach program to bring students from across the state to the Civic Center for a live ballet performance. This program received the Governor's Arts Award in 1997.

In 2008, the Board of Trustees appointed dancer, choreographer and former Ballet Nouveau Colorado director Robert Mills the new artistic director. That same year the name of the company was changed to Oklahoma City Ballet. In 2017, the name of the affiliate school was changed to The Oklahoma City Ballet Yvonne Chouteau School thanks to a generous endowment gift from Kirkpatrick Philanthropies. Also in 2017, the company moved into a new state of the art, 29,000 square foot facility designed by Allford Hall Monaghan Morris Architects.

Ryan Jolicoeur-Nye took on the role of acting artistic director in January 2022 and was officially named Artistic Director of Oklahoma City Ballet in October 2022.

== Performance ==
Oklahoma City Ballet's repertory includes works by George Balanchine, Agnes de Mille, Jerome Robbins, Gerald Arpino, Antony Tudor, Robert Joffrey, Nacho Duato, Jiri Kylian, Twyla Tharp, Jessica Lang, Cayetano Soto, Stanton Welch, Perrot, Coralli, Fokine, Petipa, Bournonville and Artistic Director Robert Mills. Oklahoma City Ballet has also presented special dance attractions as part of its role in serving the community. In the past, it has sponsored performances by Mikhail Baryshnikov, Rudolf Nureyev, the San Francisco Ballet, Hubbard Street Dance Chicago, and Alvin Ailey American Dance Theater.

The Oklahoma City Ballet tours regionally and is the resident dance company of the Civic Center Music Hall in Oklahoma City.

== School ==
The Yvonne Chouteau School, the official school of Oklahoma City Ballet, offers classes from beginner to advanced levels. The School is named to honor the memory of Yvonne Chouteau, who was the first artistic director along with her husband Miguel Terekhov. The Oklahoma City Ballet Yvonne Chouteau School trains students who wish to become professional ballet dancers, and recreational students. Students trained in the school have been regularly accepted into summer sessions and advanced classes at the School of American Ballet, Houston Ballet, Pacific Northwest Ballet, the San Francisco Ballet and others. Former students have gone on to professional careers with the American Ballet Theatre, Aspen/Santa Fe Ballet, Sacramento Ballet, David Parsons Dance and the Oklahoma City Ballet itself.

== See also ==
- Five Moons, five Native American ballerinas from the U.S. state of Oklahoma who achieved international prominence during the 20th century
