= Boris Skibine =

Russian ballet dancer

Boris Alexandrovich Skibin (Russian: Борис Александрович Скибин; 3 June 1876 – 3 December 1937), spelled Skibine in French, was a Russian ballet dancer with the Ballets Russes, as was his son, George. Boris Skibine appeared in Gaston Roudès' 1935 comedy, Le chant de l'amour.

Skibin was born in the village of Sharapovka, near Belgorod, and served with the Imperial Army during World War I. He was executed in 1937 during the Great Purge. He was posthumously rehabilitated in 1989.

== See also ==
- List of Russian ballet dancers
