= Marjorie Tallchief =

American ballerina (1926–2021)

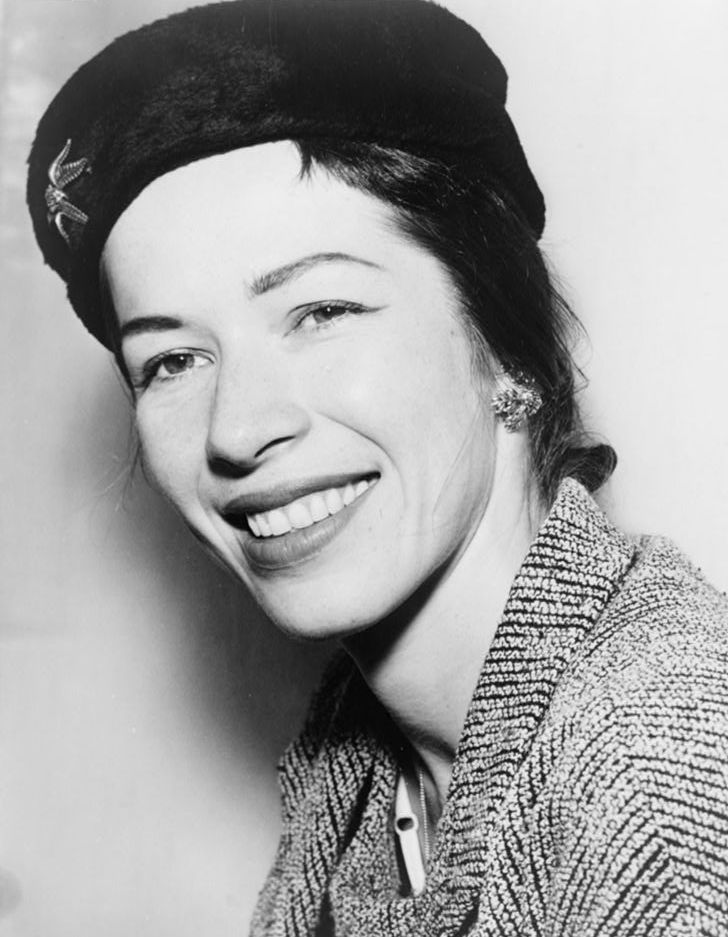
- Tallchief in 1956
- Born: Marjorie Louise Tall Chief; October 19, 1926; Denver, Colorado, U.S.
- Died: November 30, 2021 (aged 95); Boca Raton, Florida, U.S.
- Occupation: Ballerina
- Spouse: George Skibine (m. 1947; died 1981)
- Children: 2
- Dancing career
- Former groups: Paris Opera Ballet

Marjorie Tallchief (born Marjorie Louise Tall Chief; October 19, 1926 – November 30, 2021) was an American ballerina and member of the Osage Nation. She was the younger sister of prima ballerina Maria Tallchief and was the first Native American to be named "première danseuse étoile" in the Paris Opera Ballet.

== Early life ==
Tallchief was born October 19, 1926, in Denver, Colorado, while her parents, Alexander Tall Chief and his wife, Ruth (née Porter), were on a family vacation with her older siblings, brother Gerald and sister Maria. She grew up in Fairfax, Oklahoma, until 1933, when her family moved to Los Angeles so she and her sister could train in ballet dancing. She trained with Bronislava Nijinska and David Lichine. Her father was a member of the Osage Nation, while her mother was of Scottish-Irish descent.

== Career ==
After completing her training in Los Angeles, Tallchief began performing for several dance companies. In the book American Indian Ballerinas, Lili Cockerille Livingston wrote that Tallchief had her professional debut with Lucia Chase and Richard Pleasant's Ballet Theatre as a first year soloist, in 1944. According to the Encyclopedia of Oklahoma History and Culture, these included: "the American Ballet Russe de Monte Carlo (1946–47), the Grand Ballet du Marquis de Cuevas (1948–55), Ruth Page's Chicago Opera Ballet (guest artist, 1958–62), and the Harkness Ballet (prima ballerina, 1964–66). Her most acclaimed roles were performed in Night Shadow (1950), Annabel Lee (1951), Idylle (1954), Romeo and Juliet (1955), and Giselle (1957)."

Tallchief was the first American and Native American to be "première danseuse étoile" of the Paris Opera Ballet and performed with the Grand Ballet du Marquis de Cuevas. During her career she also performed for dignitaries such as U.S. Presidents John F. Kennedy and Lyndon B. Johnson, and French President Charles de Gaulle. Tallchief taught at Dallas Civic Ballet Academy, later known as the Dallas Ballet. After her retirement from the stage, she acted as a dance director for the Dallas Ballet, the Chicago Ballet School, and the Harid Conservatory until 1993. She and her sister Maria also co-founded the Chicago City Ballet in 1980.

== Accolades ==
In 1991, Tallchief was inducted into the Oklahoma Hall of Fame. In October 1997, she and her elder sister Maria, along with Moscelyne Larkin, Rosella Hightower, and Yvonne Chouteau, were named Oklahoma Treasures at the Governor's Arts Awards. A bronze statue of her along with the other Five Moons were unveiled in 2007 on the grounds of the Tulsa Historical Society.

== Personal life ==
Tallchief and the director and choreographer George Skibine married in 1947; they had two children. They lived in Boca Raton, Florida, where she died on November 30, 2021, at the age of 95.
