= Young Soon Hue =

South Korean ballet dancer and choreographer (born 1963)

- Hangul: 허용순
- Hanja: 許庸純
- RR: Heo Yongsun
- MR: Hŏ Yongsun

Young Soon Hue (born 1963) is a contemporary ballet choreographer. She was born in South Korea and trained in South Korea and France. She began her professional career at Ballett Frankfurt, Germany, under the direction of William Forsythe and continued in Switzerland with Ballett Zürich and as soloist at Basel Ballet. She concluded her active dance career as a principal at the Deutsche Oper am Rhein, Düsseldorf, and continues as instructor in their school. She got engaged in 1990 and married in 1991.

She has danced as soloist and principal in works by major international choreographers, including William Forsythe, John Cranko, and Paul Taylor.

Elle Chante is her first major choreographic work, created on Ballett am Rhein, Düsseldorf, in 2001. She has since created works for numerous companies, including Tulsa Ballet; Queensland Ballet, Brisbane, Australia; and the Korea National Ballet.

Under commission by Tulsa Ballet, she choreographed This Is Your Life which premiered in April 2008. It has since been performed by Aalto Ballett, Essen, Germany; the National Ballet of Turkey, Ankara; and in 2009 by Tulsa Ballet in its New York City program at the Joyce Theater.

== Sources ==
- Playbill, Tulsa Ballet, Joyce Theater, 11–15 August 2009, "Who's Who in the Company".
- "Tulsa Ballet Going All-Out in NY" by James D. Watts, Jr., Tulsa World, 2 August 2009
