= Moscelyne Larkin =

Native American ballerina (1925–2012)

- Born: January 14, 1925; Miami, Oklahoma, U.S.
- Died: April 25, 2012 (aged 87); Tulsa, Oklahoma, U.S.
- Occupation: Ballerina
- Years active: 1941–1954
- Spouse: Roman Jasinski (m. 1943; died 1991)
- Children: 1

Edna Moscelyne Larkin Jasinski (January 14, 1925 – April 25, 2012) was a Native American ballerina and one of the Five Moons", Indigenous ballerinas from Oklahoma who gained international fame in the 20th century. After dancing with the Original Ballet Russe and the Ballet Russe de Monte Carlo, she and her husband settled in Tulsa, Oklahoma, where in 1956 they founded the Tulsa Ballet and its associated school. It became a major regional company in the American Southwest and made its New York City debut in 1983. She is portrayed in the mural Flight of Spirit displayed in the Rotunda of the Oklahoma State Capitol building.

== Early life and education ==
Edna Moscelyne Larkin was born in Miami, Oklahoma in 1925, the only daughter of Eva Matlagova-Larkin, a young dancer from Russia, and Rueben Francis Larkin, an Eastern Shawnee/Peoria Indian. Her mother trained her in ballet until the girl was old enough to move to New York City to further her studies. There she studied under Vincenzo Celli, Mikhail Mordkin, and Anatole Vilzak-Shollar.

== Dancing career ==
In 1941, at age 15, Larkin joined Colonel Wassily de Basil's Original Ballet Russe. She performed with the company in Europe and the Americas. While dancing with the company, Larkin met her future husband Roman Jasinski, a premier danseur from Poland.

In 1948, she achieved the rank of a ballerina; she and her husband had both moved to the Ballet Russe de Monte Carlo, directed by Serge Denham. Radio City Music Hall often showcased her as a prima ballerina. In 1954 Larkin toured Asia, performing in Alexandra Danilova's "Great Movements in Dance". She excelled in comical roles as a soubrette. She played the can-can dancer in Gaîté Parisienne. Agnes de Mille, the choreographer and dancer, admired Larkin's performance as the Cowgirl in Aaron Copland's Rodeo, a role which was premiered by de Mille.

== Marriage and family ==
Larkin married Roman Jasinski in 1943. After they had a son, Roman Larkin Jasinski, on February 21, 1954, they decided to retire from performing. They moved to Tulsa, Oklahoma, where they created a ballet school and founded the Tulsa Civic Ballet (later known as the Tulsa Ballet). It became a major company in the Southwest and made its premier in New York in 1983. Larkin introduced area schoolchildren to ballet and also taught ballet to higher-level students at the University of Tulsa.

== Honors ==
In 1967, Quapaw-Cherokee composer Louis Ballard wrote the music for the ballet, The Four Moons, for the Oklahoma Indian Ballerina Festival. The ballet honors the Five Moons : Larkin, Yvonne Chouteau, Rosella Hightower, and sisters Maria and Marjorie Tallchief. In its solos, the dancers evoked their four distinct tribal cultures.

Larkin was inducted into the Oklahoma Hall of Fame in 1978. In 1988, she received the annual Dance Magazine Award. In 1993, she was inducted in the Oklahoma Women's Hall of Fame. The Council of American Indians honored her as "Outstanding Indian" that same year. Chickasaw artist Mike Larsen included Larkin in his monumental mural, Flight of Spirit, displayed in the Great Rotunda of the Oklahoma State Capitol in Oklahoma City.

== Death ==
Larkin suffered from Alzheimer's disease and died in Tulsa, Oklahoma, April 25, 2012, from pneumonia. She is survived by her son, Roman Larkin Jasinski.
