= École supérieure de danse de Cannes Rosella Hightower =

Dance school in Cannes, France

Coordinates: 43.585°N 6.999°E

The Ecole Supérieure de Danse de Cannes Rosella Hightower (formerly Centre de Danse International Rosella Hightower) is a dance school created by the prima ballerina Rosella Hightower in 1961 in Cannes, on the French Riviera. The school is currently a dance training center in ballet, contemporary dance and modern jazz.

== Historic ==
Rosella Hightower left the leadership of the school in 2001. She named her successor, the dancer Monique Loudières, former star of the Paris Opera Ballet who became head of the school from 2001 to 2009. Paola Cantalupo, former star of the Monte Carlo Ballet, took over school management from 2009. Alumni of the school include Anton Dolin, Serge Lifar, Rudolf Nureyev, Maurice Béjart, Nima Kiann, Gilles Jobin, and Roberto Baiocchi.

== Education ==
The École Supérieure de Danse de Cannes Rosella Hightower offers different courses:

- The Dance-academic cycle (11 to 18)(Professional program).
- The Cannes Jeune Ballet cycle, including Higher National Diploma Professional dancer (DNSP D) (18–23 years)(Professional program).
- The Diploma of dance teacher (from 18 years).
- The Free artistic practice open to the public with dance classes.

== Direction ==
- 1961-2001: Rosella Hightower
- 2001-2009: Monique Loudières
- Since 2009: Paola Cantalupo

== Website link ==
- Official website
