= Louis W. Ballard =

American classical composer

- Born: Honganozhe; July 8, 1931; Devil's Promenade, Oklahoma, US
- Died: February 9, 2007 (aged 75); Santa Fe, New Mexico, US
- Education: University of Oklahoma, University of Tulsa
- Known for: Musical composition, writing, painting

Louis W. Ballard (July 8, 1931 – February 9, 2007) was a Native American composer, educator, author, artist, and journalist. He is "known as the father of Native American composition."

== Early life ==
Louis Wayne Ballard was born on July 8, 1931, in Devil's Promenade near Miami, Oklahoma. His father was Charles G. Ballard, Cherokee, and his mother, Leona Quapaw, was Quapaw. On his mother's side, he was related to a prominent medicine chief of the Quapaw Tribe, and on his father's side he was related to Joel B. Mayes, a principal chief of the Cherokee Nation. His Quapaw name, Honganozhe, translates to "One Who Stands With Eagles".

Ballard's education began at the Seneca Indian Training School at age six. The institution, a boarding school located in Wyandotte, Oklahoma, was established in the early 1870s and was initially a mission school supported by a local group of Quakers and government subsidies. Over time, the school came under control of the government. The mission of the Seneca Indian Training School and other American Indian boarding schools like it can be best explained by the following message delivered by Thomas J. Morgan, former Commissioner of Indian Affairs, in 1889: "[American Indian children] should be taught to look upon America as their home and upon the United States Government as their friend and benefactor. They should be made familiar with the lives of great and good men and women in American history, and be taught to feel a pride in all their great achievements. They should hear little or nothing of the 'wrongs of the Indians,' and of the injustice of the white race. If their unhappy history is alluded to, it should be to contrast it with the better future that is within their grasp."

Ballard considered these schools to be institutions that would brainwash American Indian children. Despite the efforts of the Seneca Indian Training School in discouraging him from practicing his family's customs, Ballard continued to speak in his native language and engage in tribal dances; he was constantly persecuted for doing so. This was not unlike the treatment that his mother received at another American Indian boarding school, or residential school, where she was beaten, handcuffed, and submitted to solitary confinement when she was caught speaking Quapaw. These disciplinary tactics were commonplace at such institutions throughout the United States and resulted in a dramatic loss of language and culture.

After leaving boarding school, Ballard's parents divorced, and he and his brother, Charles Ballard, lived with their mother and step-father for part of the year and with their grandmother for the other part of the year. During this period of his life, Ballard struggled with his identity. With his mother, he lived what could have been described as a typical American life-style with little spiritual or cultural guidance. In school, he was often forced to draw tom-toms and tomahawks by the teacher, and the other students would often taunt, harass, and throw stones at him. While living with his grandmother, though, he attended Baptist Mission School and took part in powwows as well as other community festivals. It is not surprising that he felt more comfortable living with his grandmother. There seems to be some speculation as to who first taught the young Louis Ballard to play piano at the Baptist Mission Church. One source states that it was his mother who first taught him, but another source claims that his grandmother paid an unnamed private tutor to instruct him. According to the latter, his grandmother's property contained zinc and lead, and as a result, had the financial means to purchase a piano as well as pay for piano and voice lessons. By the time he had finished high school, he had a number of achievements to his name. He was the captain of both the football team and the baseball team, he was named valedictorian and outstanding graduate of the class of 1949, and he performed in a piano recital that took place at the University of Oklahoma. Although Ballard was trained in the style of Western music, he was deeply rooted in the music and dance traditions of his culture. As a child, he often participated in powwows, and he would continue to participate in powwows into his years as a young adult. He eventually became a member of the War Dance Society of the Quapaw tribe.

After high school, Ballard continued to pursue music while at college. He began studying at the University of Oklahoma in 1949, and then transferred to Northeastern Oklahoma A&M in 1951. In 1954 he received a bachelor's degree in music theory and a bachelor's degree in music education at the University of Tulsa. There, he studied piano with Stefan Bardos and composition with Bela Rosza. Ballard met his first wife, Delores Lookout, on a blind date at the University of Tulsa in 1953. They were, then, married in January of the following year in Pawhuska, Oklahoma. Their first son, Louis Anthony Ballard, was born on October 30, 1954. Louis had two additional children with Delores. Their daughter, Anne Marie Quetone, was born on March 7, 1956, and their second son, Charles Christopher Ballard, was born August 10, 1957. During his undergraduate studies, Ballard began exploring ways in which he could combine his passion for his Quapaw music traditions with Western music practices. Taking inspiration from Bela Bartok's use of Hungarian folk themes, one of Ballard's first attempts at unifying these two musical practices was a compositional exercise in which he arranged a Ponca Indian melody in the styles of both Chopin and Rachmaninoff. Ultimately, he was dissatisfied with the outcome, because he wanted his American Indian-influenced music to be assessed for its own unique qualities. He felt that for it to be truly original, it needed to feature American Indian music traditions without being in the style of another composer. He would later explain, "Dvorak, in 1893, predicted that America should have a form of nationalistic music built upon Indian music and Black slave songs. So I felt that I was in good company when I took up my pen to express the sufferings of my people, their regeneration and hopes for a better future life…" While Ballard was pursuing his undergraduate degrees, he sang with the Tulsa University Radio Choir in order to support himself.

After graduating, Ballard taught music at various schools throughout Oklahoma, including Marquette High School in Tulsa and Nelagoney Consolidated Schools in Osage County. He was also the music director for Memorial Baptist Church and Madelene Catholic Church in Tulsa, and First Presbyterian Church in Pawhuska. Ballard ultimately left his music director positions and supported himself by teaching private piano lessons. He returned to the University of Tulsa to pursue a master's degree in composition in 1960, and continued his studies with Bela Rosza. He graduated in 1962, and was distinguished by being the first American Indian to receive a graduate degree in music composition.

== Composer and educator ==
After graduating, Ballard frequently attended the Aspen Music Festival and studied composition privately with notable musical figures such as Darius Milhaud, Mario Castelnuovo-Tedesco, Carlos Surinach, and Felix Labunski. He also studied applied percussion with George Gaber. During the summer, as a faculty member at the Aspen Music Festival from 1957 through 1972, he taught private lessons in percussion performance and participated in various concerts held during the festival. Louis Ballard met his second wife, Ruth Doré, at the Aspen Music Festival in 1963. She too was a concert pianist, and would later become Ballard's manager and publicist. At this time, both Louis Ballard's marriage to Delores Lookout and Ruth Doré's marriage to her husband, Robert Sands, were rapidly deteriorating. By 1965, Louis Ballard divorced Delores Lookout, and was soon remarried to Ruth Doré. Doré came from a family with wealth, and with her personal and financial support, Ballard was able to pursue composition on a full-time basis. In addition to spending his summers at the Aspen Music Festival, Ballard served as the music director for the Institute of American Indian Arts based in Santa Fe, New Mexico, from 1962 to 1968.

In 1966, the Ballard family hired Lydia Talache as a housekeeper and babysitter for their three children. While she worked for them, Lydia became very close to the family. She frequented the Ballard residence twice a week until 1970. According to Lydia Talache, Louis Ballard was well liked in the American Indian community, and his music was very well received by the community at large. She recounted that the vast majority of Pueblo people favored the music that Ballard had composed and were enthusiastic about Ballard's depiction of American Indian culture in his music. Ballard was also respected as a musician and composer among the non-American Indian music community in Santa Fe. Michael Udow, the principal percussionist of the Santa Fe Opera orchestra from 1968 until his retirement in 2009, personally attested to the respect that Ballard garnered among the other musicians and by the local community in general.

From 1968 until 1979, Ballard was appointed as the National Curriculum Specialist for the Bureau of Indian Affairs. During this time, he worked with over three hundred and fifty schools nationwide, and was exposed to the cultures and musical traditions of many different tribes. During his time with the Bureau of Indian Affairs, he made one of his most valuable contributions as a music educator and champion of American Indian music and culture. In 1973, Ballard wrote and published American Indian Music for the Classroom, a curriculum complete with recordings for teachers who wanted to incorporate American Indian music in classroom instruction.

Throughout his career, Louis Ballard composed a large number of musical works for a variety of different instruments and ensembles. Many of Ballard's works have been premiered at major venues and have garnered awards and accolades nationally and internationally. "Scenes from Indian Life" was originally a three movement orchestral work which premiered in Rochester, New York, and was conducted by Howard Hanson in 1964. The same piece with an added a fourth movement, "Feast Day," was performed by the San Jose Symphony as a part of its "Voices of America" program in 1994 along with Aaron Copland's "Lincoln Portrait" and Leonard Bernstein's Symphony no. 2, "The Age of Anxiety." In 1969, Ballard's Ritmo Indio, a three movement work for woodwind quintet, won the first Marion Nevins McDowell Award for American Chamber Music, and was featured as the opening work at the gala Quintet of the Americas concert, "Discovering the New World: A Quincentennial Event," at Carnegie Hall on January 9, 1992. The first movement of Ritmo Indio, "The Soul," was also recorded on two of the Quintet of the Americas' albums: Souvenirs, and Discovering the New World. Ballard began experimenting with other mediums and ventured outside the chamber ensemble format when he composed two works for ballet. The Four Moons, written in honor and celebration of Oklahoma's sixtieth year of statehood in 1967, was performed both in Tulsa and in Oklahoma City. It was also featured at the Tulsa Ballet's New York debut performance in 1983. His second ballet, Desert Trilogy, was nominated for a Pulitzer Prize in 1971. In 1976 Ballard's choral cantata Portrait of Will Rogers was premiered by the Kansas City Symphony with Will Rogers Jr. as the narrator.

Another popular and critically acclaimed composition is his chamber orchestral work, Incident at Wounded Knee, inspired by a stream of daily newspaper reports that were covering the court proceedings related to the 1973 occupation and conflict between the FBI and members of the American Indian Movement on the Sioux reservation in Pine Ridge, South Dakota, near the site of the Wounded Knee Massacre of three hundred Oglala Sioux by the United States military in 1890. Commissioned and conducted by Dennis Russell Davies, the director of the Saint Paul Chamber Orchestra in 1974, it was performed in New York at Carnegie Hall in 1999 at the American Composer's Orchestra's opening concert of the season, "Protest." While Incident at Wounded Knee is not a programmatic work, it represents the customs and emotions of the American Indian peoples.

Ballard's works have also been premiered at prestigious venues such as the Lincoln Center, the Kennedy Center, and the Smithsonian Institution. In 1999, he was the first American composer to have a complete concert dedicated to his music at Beethovenhalle in Bonn, Germany, and he was featured as a guest artist, in 2000, at the Salzburg Mozarteum concert hall. In 2004, Louis Ballard was inducted into the Oklahoma Music Hall of Fame making it the first time that a symphonic composer was inducted in tandem with pop music artists. His music has been featured on radio networks around the world including National Public Radio, Canadian Broadcasting Corporation, British Broadcasting Corporation, Radio France, Deutsche Welle, and Saarländischer Rundfunk. Ballard, himself, has been awarded with two honorary doctoral degrees, one from the College of Santa Fe, and the other from William Jewel College, and he has received the National Indian Achievement Award four times. In addition, he was awarded with several more awards in honor of his contributions which include: the Distinguished Service Award from the U.S. Central Office of Education, a citation in the U.S. Congressional Record, a Lifetime Musical Achievement Award by the First Americans in the Arts, and the Cherokee Medal of Honor. He was also awarded several grants that allowed him to continue his work. In addition to a Rockefeller Foundation Grant in 1969, and a Ford Foundation Grant a year later, he has received a total of five grants from the National Endowment for the Arts.

While working on a newly commissioned piano concerto, Louis W. Ballard died at the age of seventy-five on February 9, 2007, in Santa Fe, New Mexico, after a five-year-struggle against cancer. His body was cremated, and his ashes were placed on his mother's grave in Miami, Oklahoma. After 1990, Ruth Ballard had been diagnosed with Alzheimer's disease, and her mental health was declining. As a result, she had to relinquish her responsibilities as Louis Ballard's manager and publicist. In 2001, Ruth was institutionalized due to her progressing condition, remaining under the guardianship of Louis W. Ballard. After Louis W. Ballard's death, guardianship of Ruth Ballard went to his son, Louis A. Ballard. She died on January 30, 2015, in Santa Fe, New Mexico, and is buried in the Jewish section of Rivera Cemetery. Though she was neither observant nor affiliated with a synagogue, the son felt that, because of her Jewish ancestry, she deserved a burial ceremony that was as close to a traditional Jewish burial ceremony as possible.

Ballard left behind the following credo: "It is not enough to acknowledge that Native American Indian music is merely different from other music. What is needed in America is an awakening and reorienting of our total spiritual and cultural perspectives to embrace, understand, and learn from the Aboriginal American and what motivates his musical and artistic impulses."

His music has been celebrated with three concerts at the National Museum of the American Indian in Washington, D.C. in 2006 as well as a memorial concert held at the same venue on November 10, 2007.

== Awards and recognition ==
Ballard graduated in 1962 from the University of Tulsa, and was distinguished by being the first American Indian to receive a graduate degree in music composition. In 1969, Ballard's Ritmo Indio, a three movement work for woodwind quintet, won the Marion Nevins McDowell Award for American Chamber Music. Ballard's Desert Trilogy, his second work for ballet, was nominated for a Pulitzer Prize in 1971. In 1999, he was the first American composer to have a complete concert dedicated to his music at Beethovenhalle in Bonn, Germany. He has also received the National Indian Achievement Award four times. In addition, he was awarded with several more awards in honor of his contributions which include: the Distinguished Service Award from the U.S. Central Office of Education, a citation in the U.S. Congressional Record, and the Cherokee Medal of Honor.

Ballard was also the recipient of grants from the Rockefeller Foundation, Ford Foundation, and National Endowment for the Arts. In February 1997 he received a Lifetime Musical Achievement Award from the First Americans in the Arts in Beverly Hills, California. The College of Santa Fe and William Jewell College awarded him honorary Doctor of Music degrees. In 2004 he was inducted into the Oklahoma Music Hall of Fame.

== Discography ==
- Ballard, Louis W. (2003). Native American Indian Songs (CD). Southwest Music Publications.

== Filmography ==
- 1971: Discovering American Indian Music. Directed by Bernard Wilets. Barr Films.

== See also ==
- List of Native American artists
- Visual arts by indigenous peoples of the Americas
- Quapaw Tribe
- Quapaw, Oklahoma
