= George Skibine =

Russian ballet dancer, teacher and choreographer

- Юрий Борисович Скибин
- Born: Yuri Borisovich Skibin; January 30, 1920; Kharkov, Russia (formerly, now Ukraine)
- Died: January 14, 1981 (aged 60); Dallas, Texas, U.S.
- Other names: Youra Skibine; George Boris Skibine
- Citizenship: United States
- Occupations: ballerino, choreographer
- Spouse: Marjorie Tallchief (m. 1947)
- Children: 2
- Father: Boris Skibine

George Boris Skibine (Russian: Юрий Борисович Скибин; Yuri Borisovich Skibin; January 30, 1920 – January 14, 1981), also known as Youra Skibine, was a Russian-American ballet dancer and choreographer.

== Biography ==
Skibine was born in Kharkov (now Ukraine) the son of Boris Skibine, a member of Diaghilev's Ballets Russes, and Vera Skibina.

George began to perform with the Ballets Russes company at the age of five, as an extra in Petrouchka. He studied with various Russian teachers including Olga Preobrajenska, Julia Sedova, Alexandre Volinine and Lyubov Egorova before making his debut on ballet stage in 1937 in Egorova's Ballets de la Jeunesse. In 1938, at age 18, he became to dance with the René Blum's Ballet Russe de Monte Carlo. He danced with the company in 1938–1939, then performed with the Ballet Russe of W. de Basil (1939–1941), and the Ballet Theatre (1941–1942).

Skibine immigrated to the United States in 1942 and became a naturalized U.S. citizen the next year. From 1942 to 1945, he served in the United States military during World War II. His enrollment as a student at Camp Ritchie makes him one of around 20,000 Ritchie Boys, a group of military intelligence officers who used their language skills to obtain intel from the Axis powers during the War.

After the war, Skibine performed with the Markova-Dolin Ballet (1946), again with Original Ballet Russe (1947), Ballet du Marquis de Cuevas (1947–1956), Ruth Page Civic Ballet (1956–1957 and 1959, with Marjorie Tallchief), and the Paris Opera (1957–1961, with Marjorie Tallchief). In 1959 he was named danseur étoile. He was named choreographer in 1950.

Skibine later served as artistic director for Paris Opera Ballet (1958–1961), the Harkness Ballet (1964–1966) and the Dallas Civic Ballet (1969). He was made Chevalier de l'Ordre des Arts et Lettres in 1967.

=== Personal life ===
In 1947, in Vichy (France), Skibine married American ballerina Marjorie Tallchief, younger sister of prima ballerina Maria Tallchief. The couple had two children and remained married until his death in 1981 from a pulmonary embolism.

== See also ==
- List of Russian ballet dancers
