= Miguel Terekhov =

American ballet dancer and ballet instructor

Miguel Terekhov (August 22, 1928 – January 3, 2012) was a Uruguayan-born American ballet dancer and ballet instructor. Terekhov and his wife, Yvonne Chouteau, one of the Five Moons, a group of Native American ballet dancers, founded the School of Dance at the University of Oklahoma in 1961.

== Early life ==
Terekhov was born on August 22, 1928, in Montevideo, Uruguay. His mother, Antonia Rodriguez, was a Charrúa Indian, a people Indigenous to Uruguay and southern Brazil. His father, Mikhail Terekhov, a former dancer, immigrated to Uruguay from Ukraine. At the age of 8 or 10 Miguel Terekhov watched a company perform in his hometown and knew he wanted to perform. He built up the courage to ask his father if he could take ballet class; this is when he learned that his father was a professional ballet dancer. Miguel's father taught him the basics of ballet dance until he began to train with a dancer who was with Diaghilev's company. Not long after he started dancing he was taken into the National Ballet of Uruguay. During Miguel's time there he was still in high school and no one at school was aware of his dancing. A newspaper article lauded to his success with the company and his abilities were exposed to his classmates. Even with his new success his father would still rehearse with him in their family garage.

== The Original Ballet Russe of Colonel de Basil ==
In 1942 the Original Ballet Russe of Colonel de Basil came to Uruguay and desperately needed male dancers for their season touring South America, so Miguel Terekhov joined the company at 14; never finishing high school. His parents had to give parental consent for a passport because he was so young. At 14 he did not know how to care for himself so the stage director Serge Grigoriev became like a father to him. Miguel was learning the rep for the company while already on tour, learning up to two ballets a day. His first year with the Ballets Russe's he felt as if he was a part of history, with notable dancers coming before him like Michel Fokine, Léonide Massine, and Anna Pavlova. Miguel stayed with the Ballets Russes for 5 years. His time with the company ended in 1947 when they finished the American leg of their tour and were planning to make their way through Europe. Many company members had decided to stay in the United States and terminate their contracts with the Ballets Russes, Miguel did not want to see the demise of the company, with so many of the main dancers leaving, so he returned home to Montevideo for 2 years and danced with a company in Buenos Aires, Argentina.

== Ballet Russe de Monte Carlo ==
In 1954 Terekhov joined the Ballet Russe de Monte Carlo. His friend Victor Moreno introduced him to the director of the company, Sergei Denham. They came to an agreement that Terekhov would join the company for 1 year. When he tried to get his passport to the United States they did not want to give him a work visa. Sergei Denham pulled strings and he was given a work visa with no questions. Terekov met his wife Yvonne Chouteau when he joined the company. Chouteau was about the same age as Terekhov when he joined the Ballet Russe. When he decided he wanted to marry Chouteau he had to ask the permission of Alexandra Danilova, Chouteau's mentor. When everyone was leaving rehearsal one night and Danilova said "Miguel, I hear you want to marry my Yvonne," to which he replied "yes." Danilova said "we must talk about this." They both left the Ballet Russe de Monte Carlo after the birth of their first daughter, Christina.

== Post-performance career ==
The couple decided that they could not return to the touring life required of the Ballet Russe de Monte Carlo so Terekhov auditioned for things on Broadway like West Side Story, but was turned down because he danced too much like a ballet dancer. So the couple decided to go to South America to see his family and introduce them to their grandchild. While they were visiting South America they had their second child Elizabeth, who later changed her name to Toni in honor of her grandmother. After a year in Montevideo the couple went to visit Chouteau's family in Oklahoma in 1961. While there the president of the University of Oklahoma asked if Terekhov and Chouteau would teach a ballet class. Terekhov then designed the curriculum for a degree in dance at the university and was the chairman for the department. At the University of Oklahoma Terekhov and Chouteau have their own company, present productions, and dance there themselves.

Terekhov died at his daughter's home in Richardson, Texas, of complications from lung fibrosis on January 3, 2012, at the age of 83. He and his wife, who survived him, were residents of Oklahoma City.

== Notable roles ==
- Shah in Schéhérazade
- The father in The Prodigal Son
- the crusty old General in Graduation Ball
- Dr. Coppélius, the eccentric inventor, in Coppélia
- Evil Genius in Swan Lake
