= Roman Jasinski =

Polish ballet dancer (1907–1991)

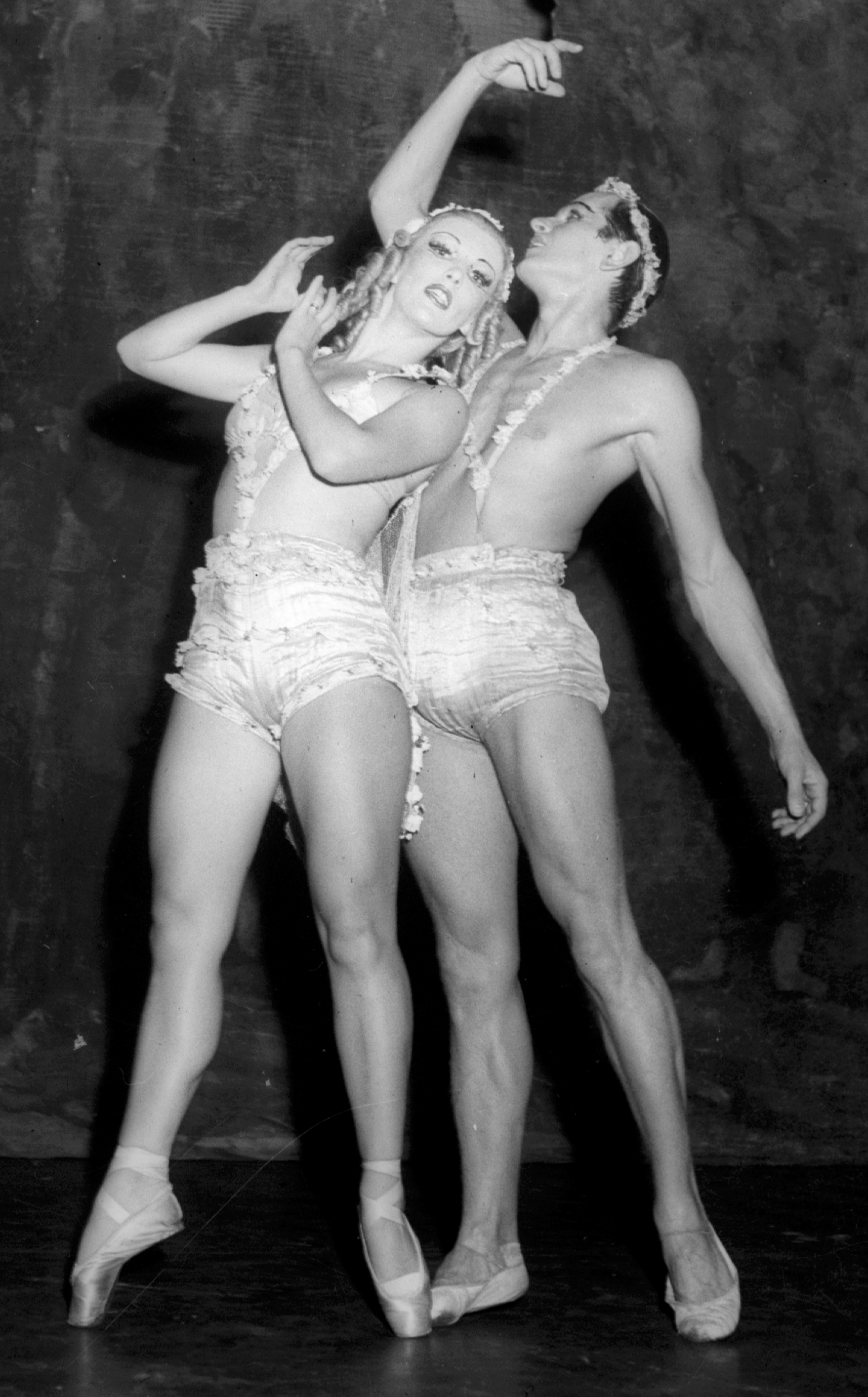
Tatiana Riabouchinska and Roman Jasinsky in Les Dieux mendiants (The Gods go a-begging), between November 1938 and August 1940, photograph by Max Dupain.

Roman Jasinski (1907 – 16 April 1991) was a Polish ballet dancer. He performed from 1933–1950 with the Ballet Russe de Monte Carlo and then became the ballet master and manager for a smaller company under Ballet Russe de Monte Carlo, the Ballet Russe de Monte Carlo's concert company. A premier danseur, he was recognized for his elegance and style, in both his dancing and choreography, which was fused with unorthodox ballet movements and port de bras that he learned from previous teachers, such as Balanchine. After his son, Roman L. Jasinski, was born, Roman decided to retire from performing and in 1956 he founded a ballet school in Tulsa, Oklahoma with his wife Moscelyne Larkin, the Tulsa Ballet. It is one of numerous regional companies founded by former members of the Ballet Russe de Monte Carlo, and is currently a premiere ballet company in the United States.

== Early life and education ==
Born in Warsaw in 1907, Jasinski began his dance studies as a boy when one of his sister's friends encouraged him to audition for the ballet when she noticed his amazing feet with a high instep. The audition process was very rigorous. Teachers and doctors scanned the boys for health and inspected their ability to be placed in various positions. Roman was among the thirty-five boys who were selected from hundreds of applicants. In Europe, when children are accepted into the ballet, the government takes over all expenses for schooling and dance courses, which made Roman's parents both very excited and pleased. Every other year, over a period of seven years, the school board of directors would come together and do an elimination of about ten boy. Roman survived these selections, along with eight other boys who remained of the original thirty-five, and graduated with honors. Roman received much encouragement for dance from his family and was able to have a chance to leave the country of Poland for advanced opportunities. After he graduated from his ballet school in Poland, Roman went to Paris and worked for Bronislava Nijinska, Vaslav Nijinsky's sister, in her newer dance program. After extensive studies in Warsaw, Jasinski began dancing with Ida Rubinstein's company in 1928. He then joined the Ballet Russe under Massine in 1931, and left the Ballet Russe, along with Balanchine in 1933, to be one of the first dancers in his newly founded company.

== Career ==
He next danced with Serge Lifar. In 1933 Jasinski joined the Ballets Russe de Monte-Carlo, where he danced works by the leading choreographers of the time, such as George Balanchine, Michel Fokine, Leonide Massine and Bronislava Nijinska. He was premier danseur, ballet master, with the company from 1933 to 1950. He would say that he "couldn't afford an injury" at the start of his involvement with the Ballet Russe de Monte Carlo, because all the repertory was placed on him and only one other male dancer. If anything happened to either one of them the company would be in trouble since there was no one who could replace them. He was better known in Europe than in America due to the companies that he was involved with in both countries. While dancing in the multiple companies that he was a part of, he was able to see the majority of the world throughout his days of touring. Roman left the de Basil company in 1947 due to the company's gradual decline. he left Europe to go to America in order to make sure that his permit to live in America didn't expire. Once he returned to America, he became the ballet master and manager for the Ballet Russe de Monte Carlo's concert company. The program was extremely successful due to the execution within the ballet of his unique style. As a result, he obtained a salary, about $4,000 weekly.

After 1954, he and his wife Moscelyne Larkin, a ballerina with the same company, retired from performing. They had a child that year and moved to Tulsa, Oklahoma. Roman bought property in 1955 where his new school would be built. He built the school on his own by explaining the overall design of how he wanted his school to look and function to an architect. There they founded and directed a school and then the Tulsa Ballet in 1956. After teaching for one year, Roman started the Civic Ballet Company. The company started with only a few people, among which were Roman and his wife Moscelyne. The Tulsa Civic Ballet took about fifteen years to build up and included a president and a couple of directors. At the beginning, Roman would always bring in guest stars to his company's performances to help build up his company's reputation and develop a certain highbrow audience to fill the audience seats. In 1979, they built a new theatre for the Tulsa Civic Ballet School to perform in. The company had its premier in New York in 1983.

Jasinski is known for having served as a model for the Walt Disney film Fantasia (1940).

== Marriage and family ==
Roman first met his wife, Moscelyne Larkin, on a tour in Washington DC. Moscelyne joined the company Ballet Russe de Monte Carlo in 1940. In 1943, Roman married her while on tour in Belisarius, South America. In 1954 they had a son named, Roman Larkin Jasinski. After his son was born, Roman stopped dancing and opened a ballet school in Tulsa, since that's where Moscelyne Larkin lived, for a nice quiet life. His son was more important to him than anything else, so Roman managed to get released from all dancing contracts, having someone else take over his performing roles and transitioning to retirement. The transition from being a professional dancer to a father and teacher was not difficult for him as he had always envisioned starting the Civic Ballet to replace his dancing career.
