= Rosella Hightower =

American ballerina (1920–2008)

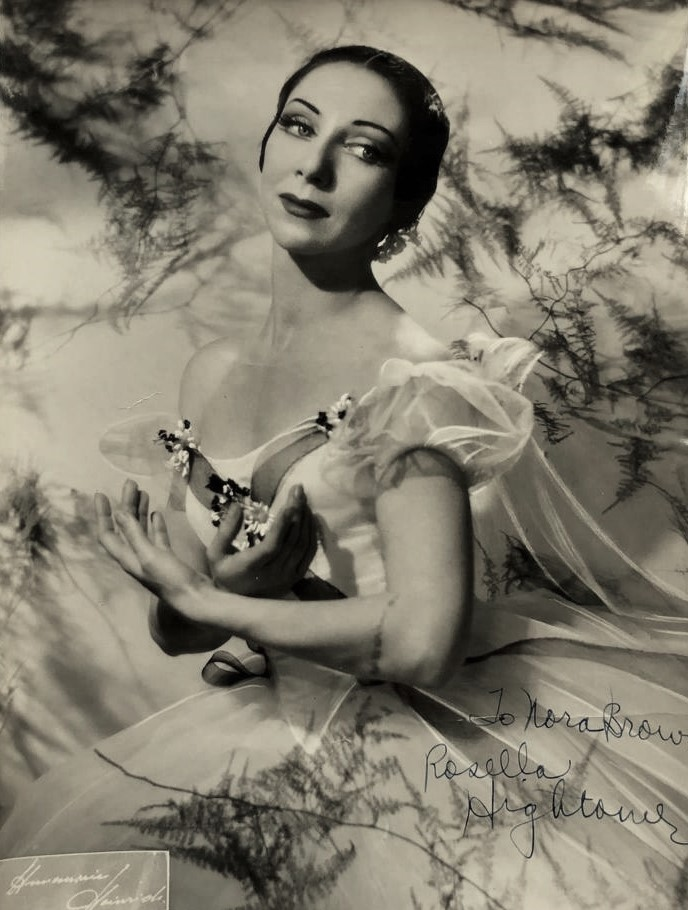
- Hightower in 1940
- Born: January 10, 1920; Durwood, Oklahoma, U.S.
- Died: November 4, 2008 (aged 88); Cannes, France
- Citizenship: Choctaw Nation of Oklahoma; American
- Occupation: Prima ballerina
- Years active: 1937–1962
- Spouse: Jean Robier (m. 1952; died 1981)
- Children: Dominique Monet Robier
- Dancing career
- Former groups: Ballet Russe de Monte Carlo; Cuevas Ballet
- Dances: White Witch in Mussorgsky's The Fair at Sorochyntsi; Black Swan in Tchaikovsky's Swan Lake

Rosella Hightower (January 10, 1920 – November 4, 2008) was an American ballerina and member of the Choctaw Nation. One of the Five Moons, she achieved fame in both the United States and Europe, and later enjoyed a career as an instructor and opera director.

== Early life ==
Rosella Hightower was born in Durwood, Carter County, Oklahoma, the only child of the Choctaw Charles Edgar Hightower and his wife, the former Eula May Fanning. She moved with her family to Kansas City, Missouri after her father took a new position with the Missouri-Kansas-Texas Railroad. Hightower began her dance training in Kansas City under the instruction of Dorothy Perkins.

== Career ==
After a 1937 appearance by Russian choreographer and ballet dancer Léonide Massine in Kansas City with Wassily de Basil's Ballets Russes, Massine invited Hightower to join a new ballet company he was forming in Monte Carlo. Hightower traveled to France at her own expense and discovered that she had been invited for further auditions and had been given no commitment of employment by the group. She was ultimately accepted into the Ballet Russe de Monte Carlo where she was guided by Massine who recognized her hard work and ability to learn quickly. There she met André Eglevsky, her future partner at various dance companies. After the outbreak of World War II, Hightower followed the Ballet Russe to New York City, where she joined the Ballet Theater in 1941.

She joined the de Basil Ballet in 1946, which was performing under the name Original Ballet Russe. Hightower received acclaim from John Martin of The New York Times after a March 1947 performance of Giselle by the Original Ballet Russe at the Metropolitan Opera House. After Alicia Markova, who had been scheduled to dance the title role, became sick, Hightower was called in as her replacement, and learned the part she had never danced before in some five hours of rehearsal with dancer/choreographer Anton Dolin. Martin's review stated that the "Original Ballet Russe had planned no novelty for the opening of its season... but there was a major one on its program nevertheless. This was the unscheduled first appearance of Rosella Hightower in the title role of Giselle", calling it "a thoroughly admirable achievement, which brought an ovation from the audience". Three days later, Martin's review of Swan Lake called Hightower "the newest star on the ballet horizon" after her two performances with Dolin and then André Eglevsky as her partner

In 1947, she accepted an invitation from the Chilean Marquis George de Cuevas to join a new ballet company, which was variously called the Grand Ballet de Monte Carlo or the Grand Ballet du Marquis de Cuevas, but was most commonly called the de Cuevas Ballet by theatergoers. The presence there of choreographer Bronislava Nijinska was one of the major factors in Hightower's decision. Nijinska choreographed for Hightower the "glitteringly virtuosic" Rondo Capriccioso. In addition to classic dances, Hightower's performances included Piège de Lumière by John Taras, the troupe's choreographer and balletmaster, in which she danced the role of a butterfly in a tropical forest who enchants a group of escaped convicts.

The company disbanded after the 1961 death of de Cuevas, and Hightower largely retired from the stage, though she gave a series of performances in 1962 with Sonia Arova, Erik Bruhn and Rudolf Nureyev. She opened the École supérieure de danse de Cannes in 1962 near her home in Cannes, which became one of Europe's leading ballet schools. Hightower later directed several major companies, including the Marseilles Ballet from 1969 to 1972, the Ballet of the Grand Théâtre of Nancy in 1973–74, the Paris Opéra Ballet from 1980 to 1983 and the La Scala Ballet of Milan in 1985–86.

She was a co-founder along with choreographer Maurice Béjart and mecenate Philippe Braunschweig of Prix de Lausanne ballet competition in Switzerland and served as a first president of the jury in 1973.

== Death and legacy ==
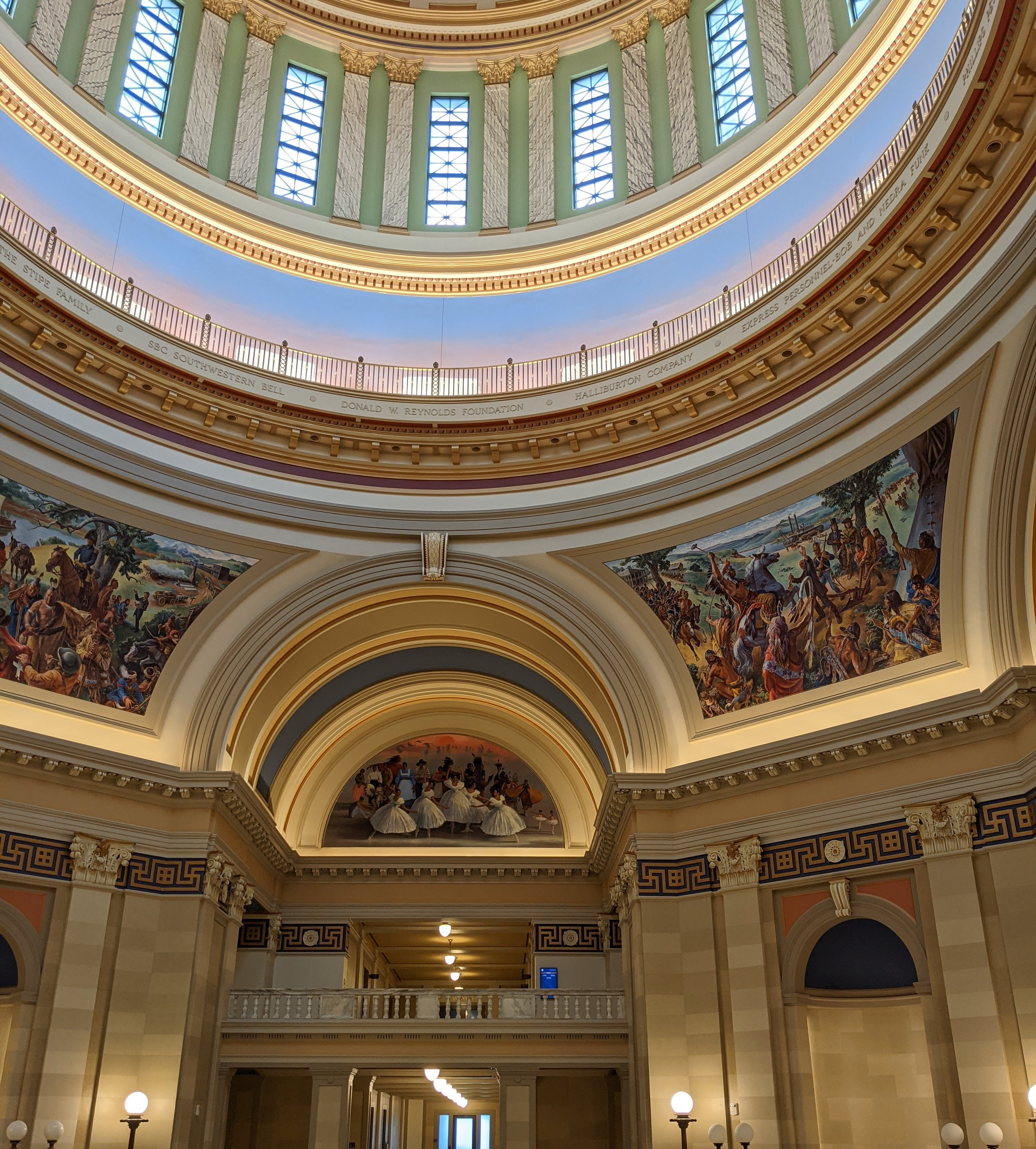
The Flight of Spirit mural in the Oklahoma Capitol Rotunda depicting Hightower and the Five Moons.

Hightower was briefly married to dancer Mischa Resnikov in 1938. She married Jean Robier, a French artist and designer, in 1952; they had one daughter, dancer Dominique Monet Robier (b. 1955). She was found in her home in Cannes, France on November 4, 2008, aged 88, having died either earlier that morning or late the previous night. She had suffered a series of strokes.

Hightower is honored alongside four other Native American ballerinas (Yvonne Chouteau, Moscelyne Larkin, Maria Tallchief and Marjorie Tallchief), with a larger than life-size bronze statue, The Five Moons in the garden of the in Tulsa Historical Society. She stands alongside the four depicted in "Flight of Spirit," a mural in the Oklahoma Capitol building. A portrait of her hangs among other famous Choctaw individuals in the Choctaw Capitol museum in Tuskahoma. In 1975, the French government named her a Chevalier de la Légion d’Honneur, the country's premier honor for her services to the opera and ballet.
