= Durwood, Oklahoma =

Unincorporated community in Oklahoma, US

Durwood
- Unincorporated community
- Location within the state of Oklahoma Durwood (the United States)
- Coordinates: 34°10′36″N 96°57′53″W
- Country: United States
- State: Oklahoma
- County: Carter
- Elevation: 840 ft (260 m)
- Time zone: UTC-6 (Central (CST))
  - Summer (DST): UTC-5 (CDT)
- GNIS feature ID: 1100372

Durwood is an unincorporated community located in Carter County, Oklahoma, United States. It is about 12 miles east of Ardmore south off US Route 177 along Durwood Rd. The community is old enough to appear on a 1911 Rand McNally map of the county.
