= Tulsa Ballet =

American nonprofit organization

General information
- Name: Tulsa Ballet
- Year founded: 1956
- Founders: Roman Jasinski; Moscelyne Larkin; Rosalie Talbot
- Website: www.tulsaballet.org

Artistic staff
- Artistic director: Marcello Angelini

Other
- Official school: Tulsa Ballet SemGroup Center for Dance Education (TBCDE)
- Formation: Principals; Senior Soloists; Soloists; Demi-Soloists; Corps de Ballet; Apprentices

Tulsa Ballet is a professional American ballet company located in Tulsa, Oklahoma, United States.

== History ==
The company was founded in 1956 by musician Rosalie Talbot and married couple Roman Jasinski and Moscelyne Larkin. Jasinski and Larkin were famous dancers who were internationally known for their style in the grand Ballets Russes tradition. Under their leadership, the troupe rose to the top echelon in the National Association for Regional Ballet in 1973 and became a fully professional company in 1978. After a successful engagement at the Brooklyn Center for the Performing Arts at Brooklyn College in 1983, a 1986 West Coast tour, and a return to BCBC in 1988 to perform George Balanchine's reconstructed Mozart's Violin Concerto, the company was hailed as one of Oklahoma's valuable arts organizations.

In 1990 Roman Larkin Jasinski was appointed to succeed his parents as artistic director of the company. The company did not thrive under his leadership and at the end of Jasinski's third season, the company began imploding as major conflicts among board members, dancers and the management came to a head. In November 1994, Jasinski tendered his resignation and left the company in chaos.

== Artistic director ==
Renowned Italian dancer Marcello Angelini was appointed Artistic Director of the Tulsa Ballet in 1995. According to Dance Magazine, Angelini managed to solve the internal conflicts within the company and raise the artistic achievements of the company simultaneously. He unified the board members, working well with artistic director emerita Larkin, and establishing friendly relationships with his predecessors. "His gracious yet fierce tenacity, tough professional reputation, and superior negotiating skills soon earned him the nickname 'The Italian Tornado'."

Dance Magazine credits Angelini with building a strong and highly versatile company that is able to tackle both classical and contemporary works by well-known choreographers. The Italian-born, Kiev Institute-trained director is said to expect dancers to achieve a technical level and artistic range comparable to that of the major companies he danced with (Deutsche Oper Berlin, Les Grands Ballets Canadiens, Cincinnati Ballet, Ballet West). He is also credited with stating that "to grow a company, you have to stretch the dancer one way, then the other".

== Productions ==
Tulsa ballet creates five productions annually in addition to The Nutcracker and reaches an audience of over 48,000 individuals every season. Under Angelini's leadership, the company has undertaken an ambitious repertory building program. For the past eleven years, Tulsa Ballet has added more than 60 new works to its repertory, many of which have been either American Premieres or World Premieres. Many of the world's best choreographers have worked with Tulsa Ballet including: Leonide Massine, Antony Tudor, Jerome Robbins, George Balanchine, Paul Taylor, Kurt Jooss, John Butler, Nacho Duato (ten works), Val Caniparoli who is its resident choreographer (with seven works and four world premieres), Stanton Welch, Luciano Cannito, Young Soon Hue, Ma Cong, Lila York, Twyla Tharp and many others.

In its first international tour in 2002, Tulsa Ballet was declared by the Portuguese national magazine Semanario “One of the best in the world.” The company has received two feature articles in Dance Magazine during the past seven years, has been featured in the New York Times, Pointe Magazine and Dance Europe among others. In March 2008, Tulsa Ballet was featured on the cover of Pointe magazine- a distinction given to only one ballet company each year. In April 2008, Tulsa Ballet completed an ambitious $17.3 million integrated campaign, which was celebrated at the opening of the brand new Studio K; an on-site, three hundred-seat performance space dedicated to the creation of new works.

== Dance company ==
Dancers for the 2023-2024 season include:

=== Principals ===
- Jaimi Cullen
- Jun Masuda
- Nao Ota

=== Soloists ===
- Donghoon Lee
- Aubin Le Marchand
- Regina Montgomery

=== Demi-Soloists ===
- Aina Oka
- Michael Paradiso
- Yuki Toda

=== Corps de Ballet ===
- Jonathan Teague Applegate
- Daniele Arrivabene
- Jonathan Beloli
- Julia Crosby
- Adrian Cruz
- Sumika Fujiwara
- JooYoung Kwon
- Carlos De Miguel
- James Lachlan Murray
- Fabian Raschitor
- Edward Truelove
- Haley Mae Wilson
- Sabrina Yap

=== Apprentices ===
- Alison Cervantes
- Talisson Farias
- Maria Rita Rapisarda
- Ian Stocker

== Former dancers ==
Former dancers with the Tulsa Ballet include:

=== Former principals ===
- Karina Gonzalez (2005-2010)
- Ryan Martin (2000-2001)

=== Former soloists ===
Alexandra Bergman(1993-)

- Ashley Blade-Martin (1999-2011)
- Michael Eaton (2005-2008)
- Kate Oderkirk (2006-2011)
- René Olivier (1999-2009)

=== Former demi-soloists ===
*Ashley Dangos (2002-2006)
- Serena Chu (1999-2010)
- Ke Da (2007-2010)
- Jennifer DeWolfe (2000-2008)
- Rupert Edwards (2004-2010)
- Ricardo Graziano (2005-2010)
- Maria Victoria Ignomiriello (2006-2007)
- Mugen Kazama (2007-2010)
- Megan Keough (2002-2010)
- Deng Mi (2007-2009)

=== Former corps de ballet ===
- Florent Bouyat (2010-2011)
- Kiri Chapman (2006-2008)
- Leah Gallas (2006-2010)
- Alex Harrison (2010-2011)
- Ilan Kav (2007-2008)
- Balázs Krajczár (2008-2009)
- Gabriella Limatola (2007-2008)
- Nathan McGinnis (2001-2011)
- Elise Miller (2010-2011)
- Masahiro Momose (2007-2009)
- Mikhail Ovcharov (2007-2010)
- Gwénaëlle Poline (2010-2011)
- Daiva Preston (2007-2008)
- Kirk Robison (2006-2007)
- Susanna Salvi (2010-2011)
- Avichai Scher (2007-2008)
- Francesco Sorrentino (2007-2008)
- Laura Suttle (2010-2011)
- Joshua Trader (2002-2010)
- Marit van der Wolde (2004-2010)
- Iseda Yuki (2008-2009)
- Zhang Kai (2008-2009)
