= Yvonne Chouteau =

Native American ballerina from Oklahoma (1929–2016)

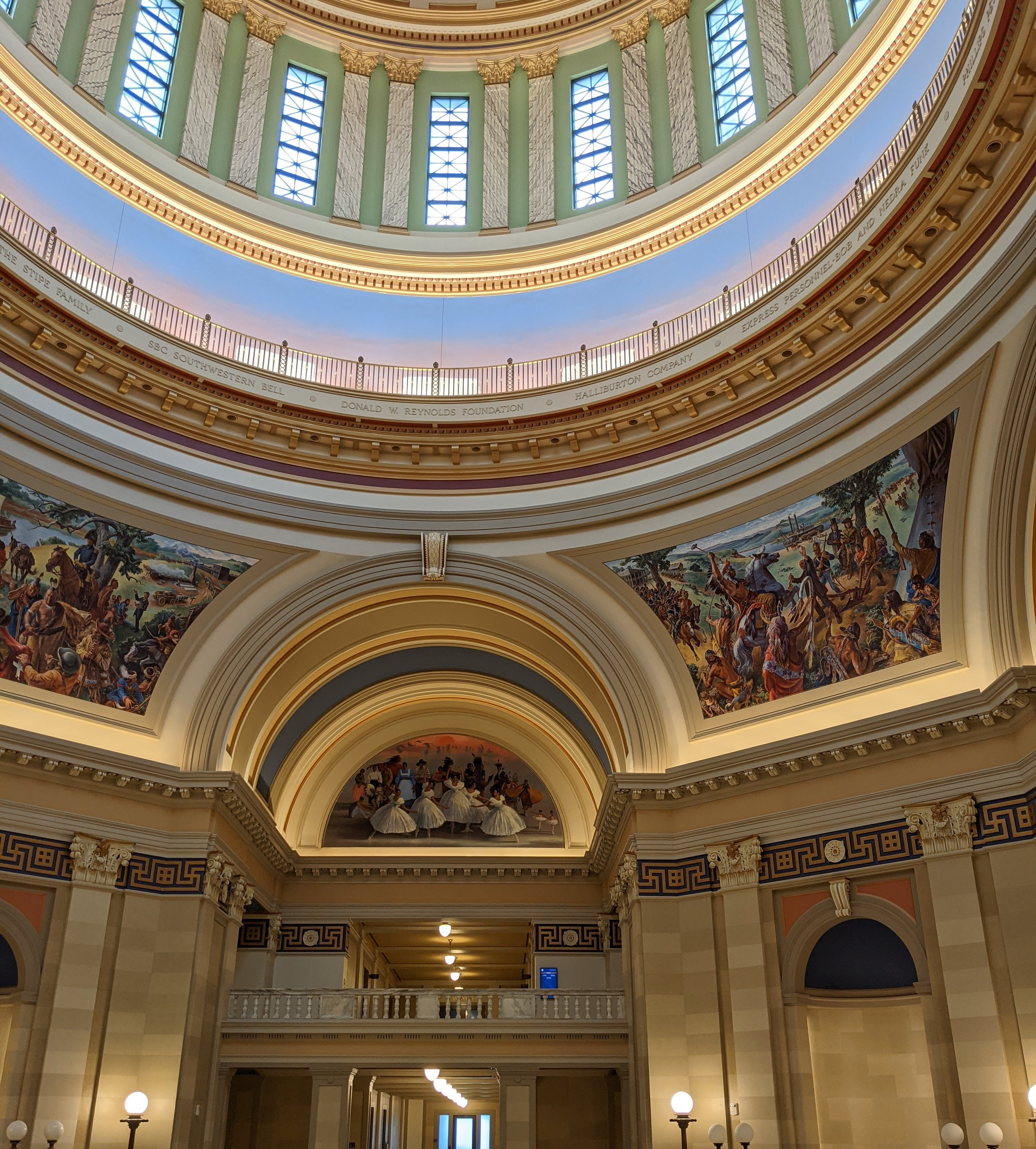
- Myra Yvonne Chouteau memorialized in a mural of the Five Moons.
- Born: Myra Yvonne Chouteau; March 7, 1929; Fort Worth, Texas
- Died: January 24, 2016 (aged 86); Oklahoma City, Oklahoma
- Citizenship: Shawnee Tribe and U.S.
- Education: School of American Ballet; Ballet Russe de Monte Carlo
- Known for: Ballet
- Awards: National Cultural Treasures Award; Oklahoma Hall of Fame

Myra Yvonne Chouteau (/ʃuːˈtoʊ/) (March 7, 1929 – January 24, 2016) was a Native American ballerina and one of the "Five Moons" or Native prima ballerinas of Oklahoma. She was the only child of Corbett Edward and Lucy Annette Chouteau. She was born March 7, 1929, in Fort Worth, Texas. In 1943, she became the youngest dancer ever accepted to the Ballet Russe de Monte-Carlo, where she worked for fourteen years. In 1962, she and her husband, Miguel Terekhov, founded the first fully accredited university dance program in the United States, the School of Dance at the University of Oklahoma. She was a member of the Shawnee Tribe.

== Career ==
Chouteau was born in Fort Worth, Texas, on March 7, 1929. Her father Corbett Chouteau worked for an oil company, while her mother Lucy Annette (née Taylor) was a schoolteacher. A member of the Shawnee Tribe, she also had Cherokee and French ancestry.

She was the great-great-great-granddaughter of Maj. Jean-Pierre Chouteau. From the Chouteau family of St. Louis, he established Oklahoma's oldest European-American settlement at the present site of Salina in 1796. She grew up in Vinita, Oklahoma.

Inspired to dance at age four after seeing the great ballerina Alexandra Danilova dance in Oklahoma City, Chouteau studied at the School of American Ballet in New York before Danilova recommended her in 1943 to Serge Denham for the Ballet Russe de Monte-Carlo. At 14, she was the youngest dancer ever accepted. Her first solo role was as Prayer in Coppelia. (1945). At age 18, she was the youngest member inducted into the Oklahoma Hall of Fame.

In 1956, Chouteau married dancer Miguel Terekhov. Her first husband was flutist and conductor Claude Monteux, though their brief marriage was annulled. After she had her first child with Terekhov, they moved to Oklahoma City. Together they organized the Oklahoma City Civic Ballet (now Oklahoma City Ballet). In 1962, they established the first fully accredited dance department in the United States at the University of Oklahoma at Norman, Oklahoma. She was featured in Ballets Russes, a documentary film by Dayna Goldfine and Dan Geller that premiered at the Sundance Film Festival in 2005. She died after a long illness on January 24, 2016. During her career, she worked with such noted choreographers as George Balanchine, Leonide Massine, Antony Tudor, Agnes de Mille, and Bronislava Nijinska.

== Legacy and honors ==
Governor Frank Keating designated her an Oklahoma Treasure on October 8, 1997. She is portrayed in the mural Flight of Spirit by Chickasaw artist Mike Larsen in the Oklahoma Capitol Rotunda, and in The Five Moons, a set of bronze sculptures by artist Gary Henson on the west lawn of the Tulsa Historical Society.

When the Smithsonian Institution's National Museum of the American Indian opened in Washington, D.C., in 2004, Chouteau was honored with the inaugural National Cultural Treasures Award, celebrating her contribution to the nation's cultural heritage.
