= Massad =

Massad (Arabic: مساد, /ˈmæsˈæd/; Hebrew: מַסָּד), also spelled Masad, Massaad, Mas'ad or Masaad, may refer to:

== Surnames ==
- Massad family, Palestinian, Lebanese-American family

== People ==
- Anthony Massad (1928–2017), American politician
- Ernest Massad (1908–1993), U.S. Army Major General
- Joseph Massad (b. 1963), professor of Middle Eastern studies
- Massad (b. 1993), New Zealand-born musician
- Massad Ayoob (b. 1948), firearms and self-defence instructor
- Masaad Kassis (1918–1989), Israeli-Arab politician
- Indra Massad (b. 1976), drummer for the Indonesian band Mocca
- Mohammad Massad (b. 1983), Saudi Arabian football (soccer) player
- Paul Peter Massad (b. 1806), Lebanese Maronite Christian Patriarch of Antioch
- Timothy Massad (b. 1956), American lawyer and government official

== Companies ==
- Bank Massad, Israeli bank

== Places ==
- Camp Massad (Manitoba), a summer camp in Winnipeg Beach, Manitoba
- Camp Massad (Montreal), a summer camp in Ste. Agathe, Quebec, based in Montreal
- Camp Massad (Poconos), a summer camp in Poconos, Pennsylvania, which closed down in 1981
- Masad, Israel, or Massad, a community settlement in northern Israel
