= Camp Massad =

Camp Massad may refer to:

- Camp Massad (Manitoba), a Jewish summer camp at Winnipeg Beach, Manitoba
- Camp Massad (Montreal), a Jewish summer camp in Ste. Agathe, Quebec, based in Montreal
- Camp Massad (Poconos), a Jewish summer camp in Poconos, Pennsylvania, which closed down in 1981
