= Winnipeg's Contemporary Dancers =

Canadian modern dance company

General information
- Name: Winnipeg's Contemporary Dancers
- Year founded: 1964
- Founders: Rachel Browne
- Principal venue: Rachel Browne Theatre
- Website: winnipegscontemporarydancers.ca

Artistic staff
- Artistic Director: Jolene Bailie

Winnipeg's Contemporary Dancers is Canada's oldest continuously running modern dance company. Founded in 1964 as Contemporary Dancers Inc., it has presented original works of this new art form in thousands of theatres, school and public places in Winnipeg as well across Canada, the United States and Mexico. In circa 1968, the WCD toured as far north as Inuvik and performed in conjunction with the Delta Drummers and Dancers in one of those communities.

The company also creates avant-garde and expressionistic dance-theatre.

== Creation ==
Winnipeg's Contemporary Dancers was formed as a student group by former ballerina Rachel Browne. By 1967, the company was touring extensively and received recognition as a fully professional dance group. It began to receive Canada Council grants in 1969. In February of that year, CBC TV created a half hour program showcasing WCD's contributions and activities.

WCD began to train dancers in 1972 when it created the Apprentice Program for local students who wished to join the company. This was followed in 1973 by the foundation of the School of Contemporary Dance that had a general interest school as well as a program dedicated to aspiring professionals. In 1982-1983, the Apprentice Program transformed into the Senior Professional Program. In 1995, the School became its own legal entity.

Gradually in 1978-1979, it became known as Winnipeg's Contemporary Dancers. Later, between 1983-1993, WCD was called Contemporary Dance Canada (or Contemporary Dancers) as it briefly sought an international mandate.

In 1984, to celebrate its 20th anniversary, the WCD established the Festival of Canadian Modern Dance. It ran annually between 1985 and 1992. The company regularly performed at Ottawa’s Canada Dance Festival as well.

== Dances ==
During its 60 years of continuous activity, dancers have performed over 600 new works. These included dances by American choreographers like James Waring and Dan Wagoner as well as by innovative Canadian choreographers like Nenad Lhotka, Jennifer Wootton Mascall, Linda Rabin, Margie Gillis, Santee Smith, Ruth Cansfield and of course Rachel Browne.

Between 2010 and 2018, the Verge program showcased emerging dancers and choreographers. Since then, this program has been known as the Emerging Artist Initiative.

WCD has collaborated with, and hosted, many national and international dance companies, including the Royal Winnipeg Ballet, Fortier Danse Création (Montréal), EDAM (Vancouver), Companie FLAK (Montréal) and many others.

In 1999, WCD initiated The Pan-American New Creation Partnership along with The Pan American Musical Art Research Inc. to accompany the Pan American Games. The project merged dancers from three modern dance companies and included creative residencies. The primary partner was Delfos Danza Contemporánea of Mazatlán, Mexico. Together, they invited Neo Labos Dance Theatre and KAATSBAAN International Dance Centre, both of New York. This five-year partnership produced many new works including in 2001: Trio and String by Claudia Lavista/Victor Manuel Ruiz, Cariatyd by Ruiz, The Banquet by Ruiz, Lost Territories by Lavista, About love and other calamities by Ruiz as well as El Río by Tom Stroud.

Rachel Browne also encouraged her dancers to choreograph for the WCD. Her own original works reflected her humanistic viewpoints. She devoted 48 years to the company in various leadership roles until her death in 2012.

== Artistic Directors ==
1964-1983 Rachel Browne 1983-2012 Rachel Browne was Founding Artistic Director

1983-1984 Bill Evans

1984-1990 Tedd Robinson

1990-1991 Charles Moulton

1991-2005 Tom Stroud

2005-2017 Brent Lott

2019- Jolene Bailie
