= Camp Massad of Canada =

Camp Massad of Canada may refer to:

- Camp Massad (Manitoba), a Jewish summer camp at Winnipeg Beach, Manitoba
- Camp Massad (Montreal), a Jewish summer camp in Ste. Agathe, Quebec, based in Montreal
