= Governor General's Performing Arts Award =

Annual Canadian award for performing arts

The Governor General's Performing Arts Awards are an annual Canadian award, presented to honour distinguished achievements in Canadian performing arts and culture. Administered by the Governor General’s Performing Arts Awards Foundation in association with the National Arts Centre, they present lifetime achievement awards for work in all performing arts domains, including theatre, dance, film, television and radio broadcasting and both popular and classical music; the awards are, however, not necessarily presented exclusively to performers, and may also honour people who have had distinguished careers in the business side of cultural industries, such as film, television and theatre directors and producers.

The awards were created in 1992 under the patronage of then Governor General Ray Hnatyshyn and his wife Gerda Hnatyshyn.

From 1992 to 2014, they typically honoured six figures per year; since 2015 they have honoured five. In addition to the lifetime awards, they also present the National Arts Centre Award to honour a figure who has had significant career achievements within the past year but is not yet considered to be at the "lifetime achievement" stage of their career, the Ramon John Hnatyshyn Award for Voluntarism in the Performing Arts to honour people who have been active in voluntary service to the arts, and a Mentorship to an emerging figure in the arts.

Since 2023, the Royal Bank of Canada also sponsors an RBC Emerging Artist award, presented to new and emerging practitioners in any artistic discipline.

Recipients of the lifetime achievement and NAC awards receive $25,000 and a commemorative medallion; recipients of the RJH award receive a medallion, but are not given money. The awards are presented at a live gala at the National Arts Centre, and are typically recorded for broadcast by CBC Television at a later date.

Once inducted into one of the main "lifetime achievement" categories, a recipient is not honoured again in future years; however, a recipient of the NAC or RJH awards may be later named as a lifetime achievement recipient.

== Controversies ==
In 1994, Paul Gessell of the Ottawa Citizen criticized the foundation for honouring Neil Young, on the grounds that he had lived in the United States for many years and had, according to Gessell, "turned his back" on Canada, and Gilles Vigneault due to his support of the Quebec sovereignty movement. He further predicted, correctly, that Joni Mitchell would be an honoree in the near future, but opined that she was an inappropriate choice for the same reason as Young. In 2001 he criticized the awards for paying lip service to diversity in Canadian arts despite the fact that only two people of colour, pianists Oscar Peterson and Jon Kimura Parker, had ever been named as honorees as of that time.

One named honoree in 2005, singer-songwriter and poet Raymond Lévesque, declined the honour due to his support of the Quebec sovereignty movement. The awards proceeded that year with five lifetime honorees instead of six.

In 2018, Governor General Julie Payette faced controversy when she announced that she would not be presiding over the ceremony, the first time in the history of the awards that the sitting governor general did not attend. Payette offered little clarification of her reasons for not attending, but had faced some criticism since the beginning of her term around her apparently limited workload.

One past recipient, singer-songwriter Buffy Sainte-Marie, has had her honour rescinded.

== Recipients ==
=== 1990s ===
Year	Recipient	Discipline	Ref
1992	William Hutt	Theatre	
1992	Gweneth Lloyd	Dance	
1992	Dominique Michel	Broadcasting	
1992	Mercedes Palomino	Theatre	
1992	Oscar Peterson	Popular music	
1992	Léopold Simoneau	Classical music	
1992	Norman Jewison	Hnatyshyn Award	
1992	Gilles Maheu, Carbone 14	National Arts Centre Award	
1993	Ludmilla Chiriaeff	Dance	
1993	Leonard Cohen	Popular music	
1993	Don Haig	Film	
1993	Lois Marshall	Classical music	
1993	Monique Mercure	Theatre	
1993	Gilles Vigneault	Popular music	
1993	Joan Chalmers	Hnatyshyn Award	
1993	Michel Marc Bouchard and Les Deux Mondes	National Arts Centre Award	
1994	Frédéric Back	Film	
1994	Robert Charlebois	Popular music	
1994	Celia Franca	Dance	
1994	Frances Hyland	Theatre	
1994	Jean Papineau-Couture	Classical music	
1994	Neil Young	Popular music	
1994	Sandra Kolber	Hnatyshyn Award	
1994	Robert Lepage	National Arts Centre Award	
1995	Denys Arcand	Film	
1995	Maureen Forrester	Classical music	
1995	Peter Gzowski	Broadcasting	
1995	Paul Hébert	Theatre	
1995	Anne Murray	Popular music	
1995	Jeanne Renaud	Dance	
1995	Arthur Gelber	Hnatyshyn Award	
1995	Ben Heppner	National Arts Centre Award	
1996	François Barbeau	Theatre	
1996	Michel Brault	Film	
1996	Martha Henry	Theatre	
1996	Joni Mitchell	Popular music	
1996	Luc Plamondon	Popular music	
1996	Grant Strate	Dance	
1996	Martha Lou Henley	Hnatyshyn Award	
1996	Jon Kimura Parker	National Arts Centre Award	
1997	Gilles Carle	Film	
1997	Nicholas Goldschmidt	Classical music	
1997	Monique Leyrac	Popular music	
1997	Gordon Lightfoot	Popular music	
1997	Betty Oliphant	Dance	
1997	Jean-Pierre Ronfard	Theatre	
1997	Maryvonne Kendergi	Hnatyshyn Award	
1997	Karen Kain	National Arts Centre Award	
1998	Paul Buissonneau	Theatre	
1998	Bruce Cockburn	Popular music	
1998	Rock Demers	Film	
1998	Royal Canadian Air Farce	Broadcasting	
1998	Arnold Spohr	Dance	
1998	Jon Vickers	Classical music	
1998	Joseph H. Shoctor	Hnatyshyn Award	
1998	Denis Marleau	National Arts Centre Award	
1999	David Cronenberg	Film	
1999	Denise Filiatrault	Broadcasting	
1999	Mavor Moore	Theatre	
1999	Louis Quilico	Classical music	
1999	Ginette Reno	Popular music	
1999	Michel Tremblay	Theatre	
1999	Sam Sniderman	Hnatyshyn Award	
1999	Mario Bernardi	National Arts Centre Award	

=== 2000s ===
Due to a change in the award's scheduling from fall to spring, the awards were not presented in 2007.

Year	Recipient	Discipline	Ref
2000	Janette Bertrand	Broadcasting	
2000	Stompin' Tom Connors	Popular music	
2000	Fernand Nault	Dance	
2000	Christopher Newton	Theatre	
2000	Teresa Stratas	Dance	
2000	Donald Sutherland	Film	
2000	Walter Carsen	Hnatyshyn Award	
2000	Cirque du Soleil	National Arts Centre Award	
2001	Mario Bernardi	Classical music	
2001	Diane Dufresne	Popular music	
2001	Max Ferguson	Broadcasting	
2001	Evelyn Hart	Dance	
2001	Christopher Plummer	Theatre	
2001	Anne Claire Poirier	Film	
2001	Thea Borlase	Hnatyshyn Award	
2001	Édouard Lock and La La La Human Steps	National Arts Centre Award	
2002	André Brassard	Theatre	
2002	Joy Coghill	Theatre	
2002	The Guess Who	Popular music	
2002	Karen Kain	Dance	
2002	Phil Nimmons	Popular music	
2002	Jean-Pierre Perreault	Dance	
2002	Fernand Lindsay	Hnatyshyn Award	
2002	Angela Hewitt	National Arts Centre Award	
2003	Pierrette Alarie	Classical music	
2003	Dave Broadfoot	Broadcasting	
2003	Douglas Campbell	Theatre	
2003	Norman Jewison	Film	
2003	Micheline Lanctôt	Film	
2003	Ian Tyson	Popular music	
2003	Sandra Pitblado, Jim Pitblado	Hnatyshyn Award	
2003	Marie Chouinard	National Arts Centre Award	
2004	Kate & Anna McGarrigle	Popular music	
2004	Gordon Pinsent	Film	
2004	Jean-Louis Roux	Theatre	
2004	Joseph Rouleau	Classical music	
2004	Veronica Tennant	Dance	
2004	Eric Till	Film	
2004	Constance Pathy	Hnatyshyn Award	
2004	Rick Mercer	National Arts Centre Award	
2005	Peter Boneham	Dance	
2005	Jackie Burroughs	Film	
2005	Marcel Dubé	Theatre	
2005	Oliver Jones	Popular music	
2005	Moses Znaimer	Broadcasting	
2005	Gail Asper	Hnatyshyn Award	
2005	k.d. lang	National Arts Centre Award	
2006	Jacques Languirand	Broadcasting	
2006	Lorne Michaels	Broadcasting	
2006	Albert Millaire	Theatre	
2006	Robbie Robertson	Popular music	
2006	Joysanne Sidimus	Dance	
2006	Mark Starowicz	Broadcasting	
2006	Georges Laoun, Sherif Laoun	Hnatyshyn Award	
2006	Richard Bradshaw	National Arts Centre Award	
2007	Not presented		
2008	Anton Kuerti	Classical music	
2008	Eugene Levy	Broadcasting	
2008	Brian Macdonald	Dance	
2008	John Murrell	Theatre	
2008	Alanis Obomsawin	Film	
2008	Michel Pagliaro	Popular music	
2008	Eric Charman	Hnatyshyn Award	
2008	The Tragically Hip	National Arts Centre Award	
2008	Crystal Pite	Mentorship	
2009	Peggy Baker	Dance	
2009	Édith Butler	Popular music	
2009	Clémence DesRochers	Broadcasting	
2009	Robert Lepage	Theatre	
2009	R. Murray Schafer	Classical music	
2009	George F. Walker	Theatre	
2009	James D. Fleck	Hnatyshyn Award	
2009	Paul Gross	National Arts Centre Award	
2009	Dione Taylor	Mentorship	

=== 2010s ===
Jazz singer Michael Bublé was named as the recipient of the National Arts Centre award in 2016; however, as he was unable to attend the gala due to vocal cord surgery, he received the award at the 2017 gala instead.

Year	Recipient	Discipline	Ref
2010	Bryan Adams	Popular music	
2010	Françoise Faucher	Theatre	
2010	Walter Homburger	Classical music	
2010	Édouard Lock	Dance	
2010	Robin Phillips	Theatre	
2010	Buffy Sainte-Marie (rescinded in 2025)	Popular music	
2010	Mohammad Faris, Yulanda Faris	Hnatyshyn Award	
2010	Yannick Nézet-Séguin	National Arts Centre Award	
2010	Kevin Loring	Mentorship	
2011	Yvon Deschamps	Theatre	
2011	Margie Gillis	Dance	
2011	William Shatner	Broadcasting	
2011	Howard Shore	Film	
2011	Leslee Silverman	Theatre	
2011	Paul Thompson	Theatre	
2011	Jean-André Élie	Hnatyshyn Award	
2011	Denis Villeneuve	National Arts Centre Award	
2011	Heather Ogden	Mentorship	
2012	Janina Fialkowska	Classical music	
2012	Paul-André Fortier	Dance	
2012	Denis Marleau	Theatre	
2012	Deepa Mehta	Film	
2012	Rush	Popular music	
2012	Mary Walsh	Broadcasting	
2012	Earlaine Collins	Hnatyshyn Award	
2012	Des McAnuff	National Arts Centre Award	
2012	Daniel Perlmutter	Mentorship	
2013	Andrew Dawes	Classical music	
2013	Daniel Lanois	Popular music	
2013	Jean Pierre Lefebvre	Film	
2013	Viola Léger	Theatre	
2013	Eric Peterson	Theatre	
2013	Menaka Thakkar	Dance	
2013	Jean-Pierre Desrosiers	Hnatyshyn Award	
2013	Sarah Polley	National Arts Centre Award	
2013	Anita Majumdar	Mentorship	
2014	Anik Bissonnette	Dance	
2014	Blue Rodeo	Popular music	
2014	Brent Carver	Theatre	
2014	Tom Jackson	Broadcasting	
2014	Louise Lecavalier	Dance	
2014	Janine Sutto	Theatre	
2014	Jean Giguère	Hnatyshyn Award	
2014	Albert Schultz	National Arts Centre Award	
2014	Jean-Philippe Fortier-Lazure	Mentorship	
2015	Walter Boudreau	Classical music	
2015	Atom Egoyan	Film	
2015	Diana Leblanc	Theatre	
2015	Sarah McLachlan	Popular music	
2015	R. H. Thomson	Theatre	
2015	Michael M. Koerner	Hnatyshyn Award	
2015	Jean-Marc Vallée	National Arts Centre Award	
2015	Nicole Lizée	Mentorship	
2016	Susan Aglukark	Popular music	
2016	Marie Chouinard	Dance	
2016	Ben Heppner	Classical music	
2016	Robert Lantos	Film	
2016	Suzanne Lebeau	Theatre	
2016	John D. McKellar	Hnatyshyn Award	
2016	Michael Bublé (presentation delayed to 2017)	National Arts Centre Award	
2016	Benjamin Pradet	Mentorship	
2017	Jean Beaudin	Film	
2017	Michael J. Fox	Broadcasting	
2017	Brigitte Haentjens	Theatre	
2017	Martin Short	Broadcasting	
2017	Yves Sioui Durand	Theatre	
2017	William H. Loewen	Hnatyshyn Award	
2017	Michael Bublé (award from 2016)	National Arts Centre Award	
2017	Robert Binet	Mentorship	
2018	Andrew Alexander	Broadcasting	
2018	Geneviève Bujold	Film	
2018	Angela Hewitt	Classical music	
2018	Ginette Laurin	Dance	
2018	Murray McLauchlan	Popular music	
2018	Peter Herrndorf	Special Award	
2018	Florence Junca Adenot	Hnatyshyn Award	
2018	Tegan and Sara	National Arts Centre Award	
2018	Sarah Robertson	Mentorship	
2019	Louise Bessette	Classical music	
2019	Colm Feore	Film	
2019	Rick Mercer	Broadcasting	
2019	Lorraine Pintal	Theatre	
2019	Mavis Staines	Dance	
2019	E. Noël Spinelli	Hnatyshyn Award	
2019	Sandra Oh	National Arts Centre Award	
2019	Gop Bartibogue	Mentorship	

=== 2020s ===
Due to the COVID-19 pandemic in Canada, the 2020 gala was cancelled; however, as that year's recipients had already been announced in February before COVID-related lockdowns came into effect, they were honoured at a 2021 gala, with no new honorees named for 2021 itself.

Year	Recipient	Discipline	Ref
2020-21	Tantoo Cardinal	Broadcasting and film	
2020-21	Alexina Louie	Classical music	
2020-21	Zab Maboungou	Dance	
2020-21	Catherine O'Hara	Broadcasting and film	
2020-21	Florent Vollant	Popular music	
2020-21	Lynda Hamilton	Hnatyshyn Award	
2020-21	Ryan Reynolds	National Arts Centre Award	
2020-21	Marie-Eve Huot	Mentorship	
2022	Fernand Dansereau	Broadcasting and film	
2022	David Foster	Popular music	
2022	Rita Deverell	Broadcasting and film	
2022	Tomson Highway	Theatre	
2022	Linda Rabin	Dance	
2022	Michelle Smith	Hnatyshyn Award	
2022	Crystal Pite	National Arts Centre Award	
2022	Christopher Goddard	Mentorship	
2023	Michel Marc Bouchard	Theatre	
2023	Molly Johnson	Popular music	
2023	James Kudelka	Dance	
2023	Rosemarie Landry	Classical music	
2023	k.d. lang	Popular music	
2023	John Kim Bell	Hnatyshyn Award	
2023	Paul Sun-Hyung Lee	National Arts Centre Award	
2023	Anne Plamondon	Mentorship	
2023	Ralph Escamillan	RBC Emerging Artist	
2024	Measha Brueggergosman-Lee	Classical music	
2024	Ronnie Burkett	Stage	
2024	Diane Juster	Popular music	
2024	Andrea Martin	Screens and voices	
2024	Wes Williams (Maestro Fresh Wes)	Popular music	
2024	Jenny Belzberg	Hnatyshyn Award	
2024	Mélanie Demers	National Arts Centre Award	
2024	Angela Amarualik	Mentorship	
2024	Todd Houseman	RBC Emerging Artist	
2025	Bob Ezrin	Popular music	
2025	Denis Gougeon	Classical music	
2025	Graham Greene	Film	
2025	Patrick Huard	Film	
2025	Sandra Laronde	Theatre	
2025	April Hubbard	Hnatyshyn Award	
2025	Jeremy Dutcher	National Arts Centre Award	
2025	Joshua Odjick	Mentorship	
2025	Emma Pennell	RBC Emerging Artist	
2026	Susan Benson	Theatre	
2026	James Cameron	Film	
2026	Sylvain Émard	Dance	
2026	Daniel Lavoie	Music	
2026	Tonya Williams	Film	
2026	Sae Hoon Chung	Hnatyshyn Award	
2026	Barbara Hannigan	National Arts Centre Award	
2026	Lennette Randall	Mentorship	
2026	Siibii	RBC Emerging Artist	
