= Tell Me That You Love Me =

Tell Me That You Love Me may refer to:

- Tell Me That You Love Me (film), a 1983 Canadian/Israeli drama film directed by Tzipi Trope
- Tell Me That You Love Me (TV series), a 2023 South Korean television series
- "Tell Me That You Love Me", English-language adaptation of the 1932 Italian song "Parlami d'amore Mariù"
- "Tell Me That You Love Me", a song from the soundtrack album Victorious: Music from the Hit TV Show
