= Rachel Browne =

Canadian dancer and teacher

- Born: Ray Minkoff; November 6, 1934; Philadelphia, Pennsylvania
- Died: June 9, 2012 (aged 77); Ottawa, Ontario
- Occupations: Dancer, artistic director, fundraiser, teacher, choreographer
- Dancing career
- Former groups: Winnipeg's Contemporary Dancers, Royal Winnipeg Ballet

Rachel Browne (born Ray Minkoff; November 6, 1934 – June 9, 2012) was a dancer, teacher and choreographer based in Winnipeg. In 1964, she founded Canada's longest running modern dance company, Winnipeg's Contemporary Dancers.

Browne was Artistic Director until 1983. She remained with the company in various leadership roles until her death.

Rachel Browne received numerous honours for her creativity as a choreographer as well as for her dedication to dance and to dancers.

== Early life and ballet career ==
Browne's early dance training was in ballet. After graduating from high school, she moved to New York City to train with Robert Joffrey and Benjamin Harkarvy. Harkarvy became the artistic director of the Royal Winnipeg Ballet in 1957 and asked Browne to become one of the company's dancers. She danced with the Ballet until her retirement as a ballerina in 1961, citing care for her young family.

== Formation of Winnipeg's Contemporary Dancers ==
Shortly thereafter, Browne began a teaching career at the Lhotka School of Ballet at the same time as beginning to choreograph new works. Her first piece, restaged many times over the years, was Odetta's Songs and Dances (1964). It showcased an earthy modern dance that differed from her ballet training.

Browne saw the need for a modern dance company and so founded Contemporary Dancers in 1964. It later changed its name to Winnipeg's Contemporary Dancers. She took on the roles of dancer, choreographer, teacher, fundraiser and administrator for the new company. She also traveled to New York yearly to study Limón and Graham modern dance techniques and to learn new dance pieces for the company.

By 1970, the WCD was a professional dance company receiving Canada Council grants. Addressing expressed needs, in 1972 Browne founded the School of Contemporary Dancers to train future dancers.

In 1983, Browne resigned as Artistic Director. Nevertheless, as Founding Artistic Director for the next 29 years, she continued on in a variety of roles. In the 2014 documentary A Good Madness, Browne explains: ”My continued association with the Company enabled me to continue to do the very things that I loved to do: teach, choreograph and perform.”

== Creations ==
In the 1960s, Browne's choreography underwent a change towards simpler, feminist works. Some of these works included Mouvement in 1992, and a collaboration in 1996 with Ann Southam called Edgelit. Browne also created works on different dance generations in her project Older Women Dance. She choreographed over eighty-seven original dances, for solo, duets, trios and groups, many of these returning in a variety of incarnations. Rachel Browne danced in her own and in many others' pieces for seventy-five years.

”When she was in the studio with dancers, she was anything but a taskmaster. She was in the studio with love and understanding and encouragement.” Odette Heyn, former dancer, choreographer and co-founder of the School of Contemporary Dance, described Browne in A Good Madness.

What Browne said her passion was after 1983-1984 was to: ”…focus on what I love the most and what I find the hardest, to try to make dances. … I still like to get up on a stage and perform, but in terms of a focus, it was really choreography. My needs as a performer didn’t interest me that much. The big gap that I felt with my life…this [was filled by] finally trying to choreograph. Always feeling that I was not naturally gifted at it, that I had to work extremely hard at it to make it work. I just wanted to do it.”

Browne donated videotapes of her dances between 1963 and 1994 to the Dance Collection Danse Archives in Toronto.

== Death ==
Browne died on June 9, 2012, in Ottawa during a visit to see students perform in the Canada Dance Festival.

== Accolades ==
In 1994, Browne was awarded a senior arts grant from the Canada Council.

Browne received the Jean A. Chalmers Award for Creativity in Dance as well as a Manitoba Arts Council's Major Art Grant in 1995.

She was awarded the Order of Canada in 1997.

Dancing Towards the Light, Browne's biography by Carol Anderson, was published in 1998.

In 2000, she received the Canada Council Jacqueline Lemieux Prize.

In 2001, she received the Manitoba Arts Council Great-West Life Lifetime Achievement Award.

In a 2008 tribute, Winnipeg's Contemporary Dancers renamed their performance venue The Rachel Browne Theatre.

In 2015, the documentary A Good Madness, by Danielle Sturk, premiered in Winnipeg.
