= Leo Kolber =

Canadian politician

The Honourable E. Leo Kolber OC

Senator for Victoria, Quebec
- In office December 23, 1983 – January 18, 2004
- Preceded by: Josie Alice Quart
- Succeeded by: Francis Fox

Personal details
- Born: Ernest Leo Kolber; January 18, 1929 Montreal, Quebec, Canada
- Died: January 9, 2020 (aged 90) Montreal, Quebec, Canada
- Party: Liberal
- Spouse: Sandra Kolber
- Committees: Chairman, Standing Committee on Banking, Trade and Commerce (1999–2003)

Ernest Leo Kolber, OC (January 18, 1929 – January 9, 2020) was a Canadian businessman, philanthropist and Senator, serving from 1983 to 2004.

== Early life and career ==
Kolber was born in Montreal, Quebec, the son of Luba (Kahan) and Moses Kolber, a doctor. He received a Bachelor of Arts degree in 1949 and a Bachelor of Law in 1952 from McGill University. He was called to the Bar of Quebec in 1952.

=== Business ===
Kolber was President of Cemp Investments, a family holding company for the children of Samuel Bronfman. In the 1960s, Kolber played a key role in the construction of the Toronto Dominion Centre, a landmark building complex designed by Mies van der Rohe that is credited with helping to elevate Toronto to the status of a world class city. Kolber was also instrumental in two major Bronfman deals: Seagram's purchase of a stake in DuPont and the sale of the Cadillac-Fairview real estate company at the height of its value in 1987. In the process, Kolber acquired considerable wealth in his own right, including $100 million for arranging the Cadillac-Fairview sale.

Author Peter C. Newman wrote in his 1975 book The Canadian Establishment that Kolber was so close to the Bronfman family that "Sam [Bronfman] treated him as a son and Leo worshipped Sam as a father." Newman calls Kolber "the non-Bronfman Bronfman with the big brain" and "a tough cookie," but goes on to say that Kolber "was always honest and had a sense of humor about himself." A character based on a caricature of Kolber appears in the Mordecai Richler novel Solomon Gursky Was Here; the portrait is highly unflattering.

For many years, Kolber was the chief fundraiser for the Liberal Party of Canada. He also served on the boards of many companies, including Seagram, MGM, and the Toronto-Dominion Bank.

=== Senate Tenure ===
In 1983, Kolber was appointed to the Senate of Canada representing the senatorial division of Victoria, Quebec. He was the Chairman of the Standing Senate Committee on Banking, Trade and Commerce. Kolber played a role in reducing Canada's capital gains taxes. He advocated a change in government policy to permit bank mergers, but did not prevail.

In December 2000, the National Assembly of Quebec condemned Yves Michaud, a former Parti Québécois delegate-general to Paris, for repeating on the radio angry remarks he had made to Kolber in a Montreal barber shop. Michaud had said that Jews weren't the only people in the world to have suffered. The controversy escalated into what became known as l'Affaire Michaud. Quebec Premier Lucien Bouchard subsequently resigned, citing support for Michaud within the Parti Québécois as one of his reasons.

Kolber retired from the Senate shortly before his 75th birthday in 2004. In 2005, he was appointed Chair of the Advisory Council on National Security.

In 2007, he was made an Officer of the Order of Canada.

=== Paradise Papers allegations ===
In November 2017 an investigation conducted by the International Consortium of Investigative Journalism cited his name in the list of politicians named in "Paradise Papers" allegations.

== Personal life and death ==
Kolber's late wife Sandra was a published poet and film executive who served on the board of the Canadian Broadcasting Corporation and was a recipient of the Governor General's Performing Arts Award in 1994. Sandra and Leo Kolber were among Montreal's most active philanthropists. Causes included The Montreal Symphony Orchestra, McGill University and The Jewish General Hospital.

Kolber's close friendship with former Israeli President and Prime Minister Shimon Peres dates back to the 1950s. Kolber's son Jonathan is an Israeli citizen who was chairman of Koor Industries Ltd., an Israeli investment firm.

On January 8, 2020, Kolber died at his home in Montreal from Alzheimer's disease at age 90.
