= Mélanie Demers =

Mélanie Demers is a Canadian dancer and choreographer from Quebec, most noted as founder of the dance company MAYDAY.

Formerly a dancer with the O Vertigo dance company, she launched MAYDAY in 2007. Works she has created with MAYDAY have included Les Angles morts, Junkyard/Paradise, Goodbye, Something about Wilderness, La Goddam Voie Lactée, and Confession Publique.

In 2024 she was named the recipient of the National Arts Centre Award from the Governor General's Performing Arts Awards.
