= Paul-André Fortier =

Canadian choreographer and dancer

- Born: 30 April 1948 (age 78); Waterville, Quebec, Canada
- Occupations: Dancer, choreographer, artistic director
- Years active: 1970s–present

Paul-André Fortier OQ (French pronunciation: [pɔl ɑ̃dʁe fɔʁtje]; born 30 April 1948) is a Canadian choreographer and dancer living in Montreal. He is a recipient of the Governor General's Performing Arts Award for lifetime achievement.

== Early life and training ==
Fortier was born in Waterville, Quebec, in Canada. His career as a dancer started in 1973 with Groupe Nouvelle Aire in Montreal and trained choreographers Edouard Lock, Ginette Laurin, and Daniel Léveillé.

== Early works ==
In 1979 Fortier created his own dance company called Danse-Théâtre Paul-André Fortier. He used this company to showcase his choreography, including Parlez-moi donc du cul de mon enfance (1979) and Violence (1980). In 1981 he won the Jean A. Chalmers National Dance Award, and in 1983 he renamed the company Fortier Danse-Création. His next creations were Pow !…t’es mort (1982), Ça ne saigne jamais… (1983), Chaleurs (1985), Le Mythe décisif (1987) and Désert (1989). Gradually, Fortier's works slipped from the "narrative into the abstract" leaving "the way open to multiple interpretations, giving the viewer free to his feelings".

In 1986 Fortier and Daniel Jackson founded Montréal Danse to create new works by other choreographers. They featured the work of Françoise Sullivan, James Kudelka and Fortier himself. He resigned as co-artistic director in 1989 but continued to choreograph for the company.

== Teacher and choreographer ==
In 1989 Fortier joined the faculty of dance at Université du Québec à Montréal. He also created dance solos for himself by reactivating his old dance company Fortier-Danse Création. As a solo artist, he created the trilogy Les Males Heures (1989), La Tentation de la transparence (1991), and Bras de Plomb (1993), the latter two created with the collaboration of Betty Goodwin. La Tentation de la transparence received the Dora Mavor Moore Award.

In addition to choreographing, Fortier was a dance consultant for the Canada Council from 1993 to 1995. He was also president of Regroupement Québecois de la danse.

Fortier returned to choreographing group compositions in 1996 after an eight-year absence. To celebrate the ten-year anniversary of Montréal Danse, he created Entre la mémoire et l'oubli. Later that year he created La Part des anges, a quartet with himself, Peggy Baker, Robert Meiller and Gioconda Barbuto that explored the chemistry that connects and disconnects feelings between people.

== Solo and duet choreography ==
In 1998 Fortier retired from the Université du Québec à Montréal to devote more time to teaching and choreographing. Later that year he created Jeux de Fous which included Dada-inspired choreography. Two years later Fortier again choreographed for Peggy Baker, this time in a solo piece called Loin, très loin (2000). He created Tensions for the 10th edition of the Festival international de nouvelle danse in 2001. Robert Meiller returned to dance in this duet with Fortier. The piece looked at the dynamics between youth and age.

From 2003 to 2007, Fortier was appointed choreographer-in-residence at la Cinquième Salle de la Place des Arts in Montreal. He was also a member of the Sponsorship Committee at the Grand Théâtre de Lorient (France), created during its inauguration in June 2003.

In 2006, Fortier returned to solo dances with Solo 1 x 60 - Un jardin d'objets in which he performed alone for 60 minutes. Later that year he debuted Solo 30 x 30 - Trente minutes-trente jours. He danced in various outdoor locations for thirty minutes a day for thirty days. He brought this idea to England, Italy and Japan, always performing regardless of the weather conditions.

Cabane (2008) was created and performed in collaboration with Robert Racine. It takes place in and around a modular shed. This piece toured around Canada and Europe.

== Later achievements ==
In 2009, Fortier was appointed Chevalier dans l'Ordre des Arts et des Lettres by France. In 2012 he received the Governor General's Performing Arts Award for Lifetime Artistic Achievement and an appointment to the Order of Canada. In 2013, he received a Conseil des Arts et des Lettres du Québec career grant. In 2013, Fortier joined the board of directors of the Governor General's Performing Arts Awards Foundation as co-chair.

== Honours ==
- 1993 : Dora Mavor Moore Award for Outstanding New Choreography
- 1981 : Prix Jean A. Chalmer
- 2009 : Appointed Chevalier dans l'Ordre des Arts et des Lettres by la République Française
- 2012 : Governor General's Performing Arts Award for Lifetime Artistic Achievement
- 2012 : Appointed to the Order of Canada
- 2013 : A career grant from the Conseil des Arts er des Lettres du Québec

== Works ==
- 2012 : Vertiges
- 2011 : Box, l'homme au carton, Bras de plomb(revival)
- 2008 : Cabane, Spirale
- 2007 : -20°
- 2006 : Solo 1x60 - Un jardin d'objets, Solo 30x30
- 2004 : Lumière
- 2003 : Risque, Sparks
- 2002 : Excès
- 2001 : Tensions, MVTS
- 2000 : Loin, très loin
- 1998 : Jeux de fous
- 1996 : La part des anges, Entre la mémoire et l'oubli, Tête d'ange
- 1995 : Novembre
- 1993 : Bras de plomb, Double silence
- 1991 : La tentation de la transparence, Lost, Plein le coeur
- 1989 : Les males heures, L'été latent, Désert
- 1987 : O-Pé-Ra Savon, Sans titre et qui le restera, Le mythe décisif, Tell
- 1986 : Brûler
- 1985 : Chaleur
- 1984 : Venus 84, Assis soient-ils
- 1983 : Gravitation, Ça ne saigne jamais…
- 1982 : Non coupable, Moi King Kong, Lavabos, Pow!... T'es mort
- 1981 : Fin, Bande dessinée
- 1980 : Violence
- 1979 : Parlez-moi donc du cul de mon enfance, Rêve 1
- 1978 : Images noires, Derrière la porte un mur
