= Allan Levine =

Canadian author

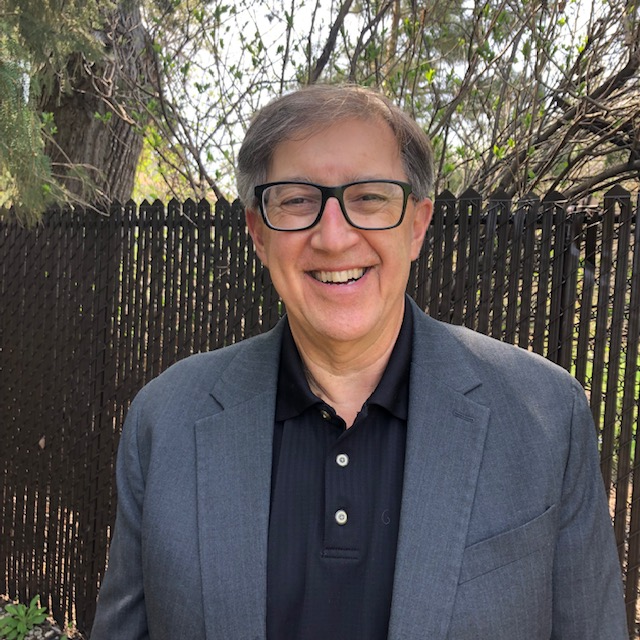
- Levine in 2023
- Born: Winnipeg, Manitoba
- Occupation: Author
- Years active: 1985–present
- Website: www.allanlevinebooks.com

Allan Levine is a Canadian author from Winnipeg, Manitoba, known mainly for his non-fiction and historical mystery writing.

== Life and works ==
Levine attended the University of Manitoba and the University of Toronto. He received a PhD in Canadian history from the University of Toronto in 1985. His graduate thesis on the grain business in Winnipeg was turned into his first book in 1987, at which point he was teaching and freelancing as a journalist. He is an alumnus of Camp Massad of Manitoba.

Levine's non-fiction work Fugitives of the Forest was awarded the Yad Vashem Prize in Holocaust History in the 1999 Canadian Jewish Book Awards. His series of Sam Klein Mysteries followed. In late 2004, Levine toured Germany promoting Die Sünden der Suffragetten, the German translation of his mystery Sins of the Suffragette. On October 2, 2020, the University of Winnipeg announced that Levine would receive an honorary doctor of laws at the convocation on October 23, 2020.

=== Published works ===
==== Non-fiction ====
- The Dollar A Year Men: How the Best Business Brains in Canada Helped to Win the Second World War. Toronto: Barlow Books, 2025.
- Details are Unprintable: Wayne Lonergan and the Sensational Café Society Murder . Guilford, Ct: Lyons Press, 2020.
- Seeking the Fabled City: The Canadian Jewish Experience. Toronto: McClelland & Stewart, 2018.
- Toronto: Biography of a City. Vancouver: Douglas & McIntyre, 2014.
- Miracle at the Forks: The Museum That Dares Make a Difference. Vancouver: Figure 1 Publishing, 2014. Co-authored with Peter C. Newman
- King: William Lyon Mackenzie King: A Life Guide by the Hand of Destiny. Vancouver and Toronto: Douglas & McIntyre, 2011. Winner of the Alexander Kennedy Isbister Award for Non-Fiction, 2012.
- Coming of Age: A History of the Jewish People of Manitoba. Winnipeg: Jewish Heritage Centre of Western Canada and Heartland Associates, 2009. Winner of the McNally-Robinson Book of the Year, 2010 and the Winner of the Helen and Stan Vine Canadian Jewish Book Award for History, 2010.
- The Devil in Babylon: Fear of Progress and the Birth of Modern Life. Toronto: McClelland & Stewart, 2005.
- Scattered Among the Peoples: The Jewish Diaspora in Ten Portraits. Toronto: McClelland and Stewart, 2002.
- Fugitives of the Forest: The Heroic Story of Jewish Resistance and Survival During the Second World War. Toronto: Stoddart Publishing, 1998. Second Edition: Guilford, CT: The Lyons Press, 2008. Winner of the Yad Vashem Prize in Holocaust History, Canadian Jewish Book Awards, 1999
- Scrum Wars: The Prime Ministers and the Media. Toronto: Dundurn Press, 1993. ISBN 978-1-550021-91-2
- The Exchange: 100 Years of Trading Grain in Winnipeg. Winnipeg: Peguis Publishers Limited, 1987. ISBN 978-0920541-40-1

==== Historical fiction ====
- The Bootlegger's Confession (A Sam Klein Mystery). Winnipeg: Ravenstone, 2016.
- Evil of the Age A Thriller. New York: Skyhorse Publishing, 2014. ISBN 978-16315801-1-6
- The Bolshevik's Revenge (A Sam Klein Mystery). Winnipeg: Great Plains Publications. Winnipeg: Great Plains Publications, 2002. ISBN 978-1894283-33-5
- Sins of the Suffragette (A Sam Klein Mystery). Winnipeg: Great Plains Publications, 2000. ISBN 978-1894283-16-8
- The Blood Libel (A Sam Klein Mystery). Winnipeg: Great Plains Publications Limited, 1997. ISBN 978-0969780-45-8
