= Zevi Scharfstein =

Hebrew-language educator and lexicographer

- צבי שרפשטיין
- Born: 15 March 1884; Dunaivtsi (Dinovitz), Podolia region, Russian Empire
- Died: 11 October 1972 (aged 88)
- Education: Honorary doctorate, Jewish Theological Seminary of America
- Occupations: educator, writer, lexicographer
- Organization(s): Shilo publishing house; Bureau of Jewish Education of NYC
- Movement: Revival of the Hebrew language
- Spouse: Rose Goldfarb
- Children: Ben‐Ami Scharfstein, Shulamith Scharfstein Chernoff

Zevi Scharfstein (Hebrew: צבי שרפשטיין) was a prolific Hebrew-language educator, writer, and publishing entrepreneur who authored 423 works in 698 publications during his career. The hosts of a special celebration in Detroit honoring Scharfstein on his seventieth birthday in 1954 described him as "one of the country's leading Jewish educators" whose Hebrew instructional materials were in very wide use in the United States. His 1972 obituary in the New York Times attributed a hundred Hebrew textbooks for children to his credit, many of which in the early 1970s were "still considered classics in Hebrew schools."

Scharfstein was educated as a child by private tutors, and his only official academic degree was an honorary Doctor of Hebrew Letters, awarded by the Jewish Theological Seminary of America. But his prolific career and founding of the Shilo publishing house made him "a teacher of teachers" in the Jewish Diaspora.

== Personal life ==
Scharfstein was born in Dunaivtsi in the Podolia region of the Russian Empire, in present-day Ukraine. During his childhood, he was strongly influenced by the Haskalah movement, and the movement's emphasis on childhood education and the development of a contemporary Hebrew press both shaped his life and career. After witnessing the violence of pogroms in the region followed by the onset of World War I, Scharfstein immigrated to the United States "without a broken heart." He wrote of "writing new textbooks intended and prepared for the young generation of America."

== Career ==
Once in the US, he quickly founded a monthly magazine for children, Shaharut (Youth). Published by the Bureau of Jewish Education in New York City, Shaharut's original mission was to teach Jewish topics and Hebrew language. After the 1917 Balfour Declaration, the periodical shifted to short stories and articles about Jewish life in Palestine. Scharfstein also joined the Bureau of Jewish Education, founded by noted American Hebraist Samson Benderly in 1910, although Scharfstein was not among the group of proteges known as "the Benderly Boys," Scharfstein believing that Benderly often preferred American-born recruits over immigrants. Scharfstein was an instructor of Hebrew and Hebrew education at the Teachers Institute of the Jewish Theological Seminary in New York City from 1916 until his retirement in 1960.

In the early 1920s, he founded Shilo Publishing House with the help of his brother, Asher. Controlling his own press and going to market with his own materials freed Scharfstein from the limitations of working within the existing philosophical, pedagogical, and financial power structures of the Hebraist movement. One of his first books was emblematic of his mission: Sifurei ha-Torah le-yeladim (Torah Stories for Children). Shilo is still in operation, offering books on "the Hebrew language, studying to read the Haftorah, and the works of Nachmanides," as well as a widely used Siddur for children and Hebrew-English and English-Hebrew dictionaries.

Scharfstein's educational materials, textbooks writing, and curriculum development emphasized stories, pictures, and formats that modeled and extolled a lifestyle that was both Jewish and American. His textbooks featured stories about American Jewish children enjoying American life within the context of Jewish perspectives and values. He also penned biographic sketches and profiles of American Jews to illuminate how they could become both emblematically American and Jewish figures.

Together with his son, Ben-Ami Scharfstein, he authored the first Hebrew textbook for blind English-speaking readers with the Jewish Braille Institute. Ben-Ami went on to teach philosophy at Tel Aviv University.

Scharfstein was awarded the 1954 Louis Lamed Foundation annual prize for Hebrew literature, citing his autobiography "Haya Aviv Ba-Aretz" (It was Spring in the Land).

== Bibliography ==
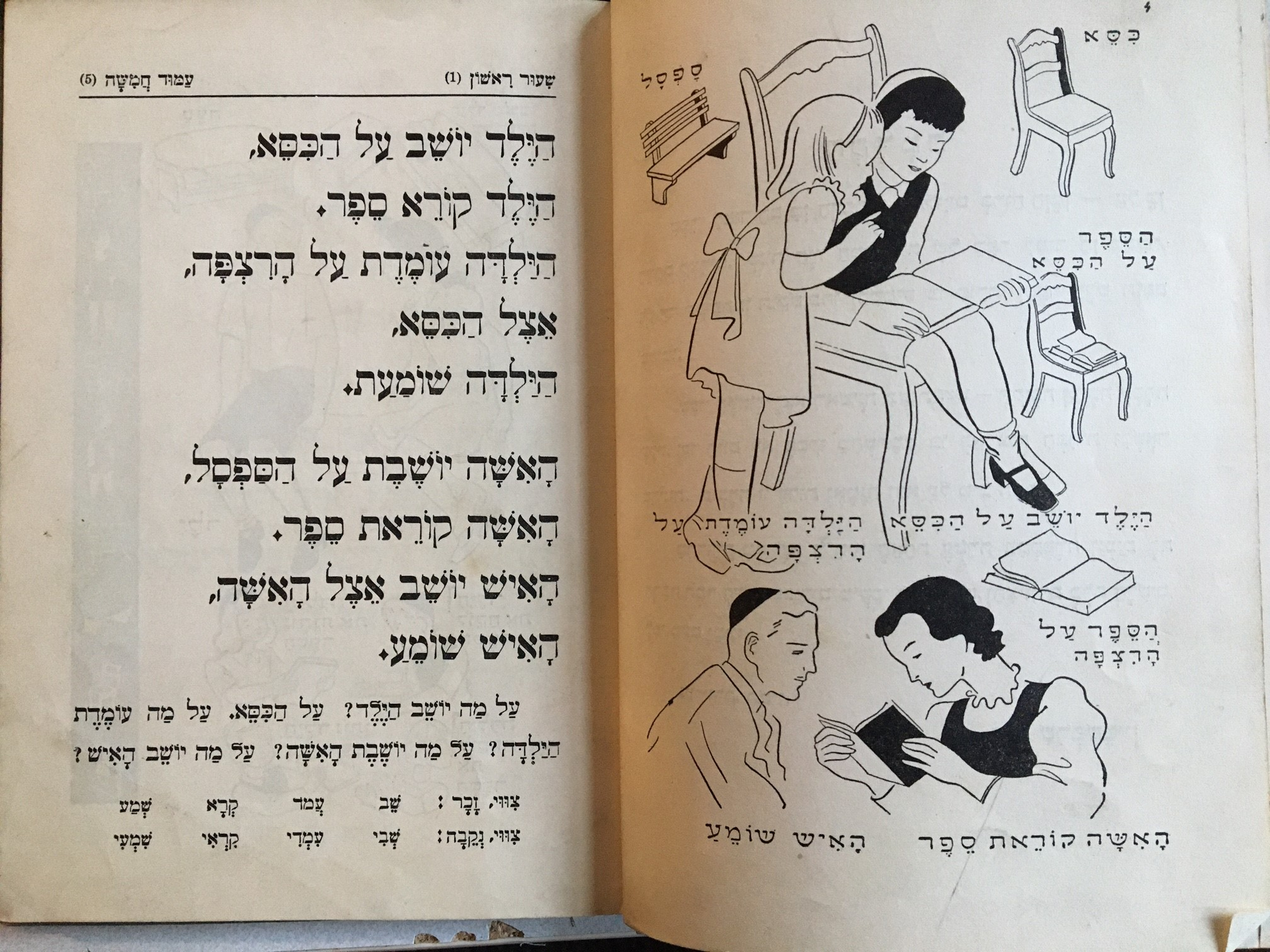
Sample page from Sha'ar halashon revised edition (1947), a Hebrew-language reader for intermediate learners.

- Sifurei ha-Torah le-yeladim (Torah Stories for Children) (1921)
- Shaʻar ha-lashon (The Gateway of Language) (1927)
- Shaʻar ha-tefilah (The Gateway of Prayer) (1929)
- Shaʻar la-sifruth (The Gateway to Literature) (1947)
- Shaʻar ha-lashon revised edition (The Gateway of Language) (1947)
- Hebrew self-taught (with Ben-Ami Scharfstein) (1950)
- Let's talk Hebrew, a beginner's book for parents and children (with Siegmund Forst) (1951)
- Haya Aviv Ba'Aretz (It was Spring in the Land) (היה אביב בארץ) (1952)
- Arbaʻim Shanah ba'Ameriḳa (Forty Years in America) (ארבעים שנה באמריקה) (1955)
- English-Hebrew dictionary (with Rose Scharfstein) (1957)
- Great Hebrew Educators (גדולי חינון בעמנו) (1964)
- Darkhei limud leshonenu (My Paths to Learning Our Language) (דרכי למוד לשוננו) (1965)
