= Thea Borlase =

Canadian theatre administrator

Thea Borlase, née Theodora May Mitchell (1921 - 2015) was a Canadian theatre administrator, who was a prominent figure in the arts community of Moncton, New Brunswick.

Born in London, England, and raised on the Isle of Wight, she served in the Women's Royal Naval Service during World War II, and moved to Canada after marrying Canadian soldier James Borlase in 1946. The couple settled in Moncton, where she began her long association with the city's theatre scene by joining the amateur theatre company Stage Door '56 as an actor.

She was later a cofounder of the Moncton District Drama Council, and served as president of the New Brunswick Drama League, the provincial chapter of the Dominion Drama Festival. She also worked in radio as a book and theatre critic for the city's CBC Radio station.

From 1982 to 1992 she served as Atlantic regional officer for the Canada Council. Beginning in 1992 she became involved in the restoration of the city's historic Capitol Theatre, serving on its board of directors for many years thereafter.

In 2001 she was a recipient of the Ramon John Hnatyshyn Award for Voluntarism in the Arts from the Governor General's Performing Arts Awards, and in 2007 she was inducted as a Member of the Order of Canada.
