= Gad Horowitz =

Canadian political scientist (born 1936)

- Born: 1936 (age 89–90); Jerusalem, Mandatory Palestine

Academic background
- Education: United College; University of Manitoba; McGill University; Harvard University
- Thesis: Canadian Labor in Politics (1965)
- Doctoral advisor: Samuel Beer
- Influences: Louis Hartz; Alfred Korzybski; Seymour Martin Lipset; Herbert Marcuse

Academic work
- Discipline: Political science
- Sub-discipline: Political theory
- Institutions: University of Toronto
- Notable ideas: Application of fragment theory to Canada; Red Toryism

Gad Horowitz (born 1936) is a Canadian political scientist. He is a professor emeritus at the University of Toronto.

== Biography ==
Horowitz was born in Jerusalem in 1936 and immigrated to Canada with his parents at the age of 2. His father Rabbi Aaron Horowitz, was a prominent member of the Jewish community and a key figure in founding Camp Massad in Canada. He grew up in Calgary, Winnipeg, and Montreal.

Horowitz earned his Bachelor of Arts degree from United College. He earned his Master of Arts degree from McGill University in 1959, writing his thesis on Mosca and Mills: Ruling Class and Power Elite. He earned his Doctor of Philosophy degree from Harvard University in 1965, writing his thesis on Canadian Labor in Politics: The Trade Unions and the CCF-NDP, 1937–62, with Sam Beer as his advisor.

Horowitz has specialized in labour theory, and most notably coined the appellation Red Tory in his application of Louis Hartz's fragment theory to Canadian political culture and ideological development, in his essay "Conservatism, Liberalism and Socialism in Canada: An Interpretation" (in the Canadian Journal of Political Science, 32, 2 (1966): 143–71). The use of this appellation differentiates traditional Canadian Toryism from the powerful classical liberal elements that began to emerge in the Conservative Party after the Second World War, but it has applications to conservative parties in other countries where "Tory" acceptance of state enterprises, the welfare state, and other institutions seen as expressions of national character conflicts with "liberal" or "neoliberal" rejection of state intervention in the economy.

Horowitz was a member of the editorial board of Canadian Dimension in its early days, and a frequent contributor to that magazine.

Horowitz teaches a class at the University of Toronto entitled The Spirit of Democratic Citizenship which revolves around general semantics, a non-Aristotelian educational discipline first theorized by Polish engineer Alfred Korzybski. A 21-part video series called 'Radical General Semantics' has been made of his lectures.

== Selected bibliography ==
- Horowitz, Gad (1966). Creative politics. Mosaics & identity.
- Horowitz, Gad (1966). Mosaics & identity.
- Canadian Nationalism: Articles on foreign ownership, international trade unionism, sports media, Americanization of the universities, and more. Canadian Dimension.
- Canadian Labour in Politics. University of Toronto Press. 1968. "gad horowitz."
- Repression: Basic and surplus repression in psychoanalytic theory: Freud, Reich, and Marcuse. University of Toronto Press. 1977. ISBN 0-8020-5379-3.
- "Everywhere they are in chains": Political theory from Rousseau to Marx. Nelson Canada. 1988. ISBN 0-17-603412-9.
- Difficult justice: Commentaries on Levinas and politics. University of Toronto Press. January 2006. ISBN 0-8020-8009-X. (with Asher Horowitz)
- Horowitz, Gad (2016). The Book of Radical General Semantics. Pencraft International. p. 260. ISBN 978-9382178170.

== Articles ==
- Horowitz, G. (1966). "Conservatism, Liberalism and Socialism in Canada: An Interpretation". Canadian Journal of Political Science. 32 (1): 143–71. doi:10.2307/139794. JSTOR 139794.
- "Global Pardon: Pax Romana, Pax Americana, and Kol Nidre". Bad Subjects. December 2001. Archived from the original on 27 September 2011.
