= Canada Dance Festival =

Canadian contemporary dance festival founded in 1987

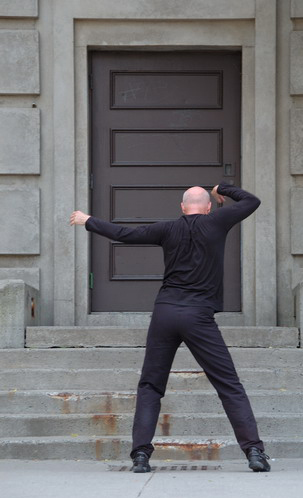
Paul-André Fortier dancing Solo 30x30 at the Canada Dance Festival

The Canada Dance Festival is a Canadian contemporary dance festival first presented in 1987 in Ottawa, Ontario. Established as an initiative of the Dance in Canada Association, the National Arts Centre and Dance!, An Ottawa Summer Festival, it was created to showcase contemporary dance by Canadian choreographers and dance companies. The planned 2018 edition was suspended because of funding difficulties.

== History ==
=== Establishment ===
The festival was first produced in 1987. Following its inaugural edition, the Canada Dance Festival Society was formed as a separate administrative organization, with an official co-production arrangement with the National Arts Centre.

Beginning in 1988, the festival was held biennially. Its aims included supporting the creation and presentation of contemporary Canadian dance, introducing artists' work to national and international audiences, and encouraging the professional development of participating choreographers and dancers.

=== Programming and 2017 edition ===
The festival presented works at the National Arts Centre and other venues in Ottawa. Its institutional collaborators included the National Gallery of Canada, Arts Court, the University of Ottawa and the National Capital Commission.

From 2 to 16 July 2017, the festival partnered with the National Arts Centre's Canada Scene programme during celebrations of the 150th anniversary of Canadian Confederation. The programme included performances in conventional and non-traditional venues, with participating artists and companies including Marie Chouinard, Peggy Baker, Paul-André Fortier and Sinha Danse.

=== Suspension of the 2018 edition ===
The planned 2018 Canada Dance Festival was suspended following a funding shortfall. The decision was announced by the festival's board of directors after several grant applications were unsuccessful. The organization also reported unexpected reductions in funding during the preceding two fiscal years, which had placed pressure on its ability to meet operating expenses.

The board said it would explore alternative funding arrangements and expressed hope that the festival could return. By the time of the suspension, the festival had commissioned more than 95 dance works. Its programming had developed to alternate between larger and smaller annual events.

== Archives ==
York University Archives & Special Collections holds the Canada Dance Festival fonds, comprising records dating from 1984 to 1998. The collection documents the festival's administration and production activities through correspondence, financial records, contracts, grant applications, publicity materials and posters.
