= Samson Benderly =

American Jewish educationist (1876–1944)

Samson Benderly (1876 – July 9, 1944) was a major figure in promoting Jewish education in the United States. He was born in Safed, Ottoman Palestine, and he later emigrated to Baltimore, Maryland, arriving on 23 September 1898. He studied medicine and became a physician, but he abandoned medicine to focus on Jewish education.

== Career ==
In 1910, he began the Bureau of Jewish Education in New York. "He was the American organizer of Ivrit be-Ivrit pedagogy – the use of Hebrew as the language of instruction." This "teaching Jewish content in Modern Hebrew ... reconceptualized Hebrew education not only as a form of language acquisition, but as a means of defining and giving shape to American Judaism for the Jewish immigrant community at that time." In 1927 he founded Camp Achvah, the first Hebrew-speaking summer camp in North America. He also supported the founding of the Jewish Teachers Association, seen as "a counterweight to the immigrant dominated Agudath Ha-Morim Ha-Ivrim, the Hebrew Teachers Union of New York."

A cadre of young men that he encouraged, mentored, and taught went on to be leaders of Jewish education in the United States and became known as the "Benderly Boys." This group included Alexander Dushkin, Isaac Berkson, Albert Schoolman, Emanuel Gamoran, and Barnett Brickner. There were also a few women considered "Benderly Girls," including Rebecca Aaronson Brickner and Libbie Suchoff Berkson, although, as women, they had fewer opportunities for leadership. The Bureau was also a professional home for other Hebraists in the USA, including Zevi Scharfstein, although Scharfstein, an immigrant, believed Benderly favored American-born recruits with weak Hebrew abilities and credentials over better qualified immigrants because he had greater influence over his local recruits.

Morris Waldman, executive secretary of the American Jewish Committee from 1928 to 1945, wrote of Benderly in his autobiography Nor by Power: "If a future Jewish historian were some day to write the biographies of, say, the ten most decisive Jews in American history, Benderly would have to be one."

== Theories about Jewish education ==
Benderly saw variety of forms of Jewish education, "a hodgepodge of congregational schools, khayders, community Talmud Torahs, and private tutors." He found that the Talmud Torah system would be the easiest to reform. This was because "despite their precarious finances and historical association with the impoverished, the schools enjoyed community support. They were generally governed by local boards of directors and supported through a combination of donations, charity benefits, and tuition collections."

Benderly was inspired by the writings of Johann Pestalozzi, Herbert Spencer, and John Dewey, and the concept of cultural Zionism. His goal was to modernize Jewish education by making it more professional and "creating an immigrant-based, progressive supplementary school model, and spreading the mantra of community responsibility for Jewish education." Unlike some branches of traditional Jewish education, Benderly stressed cognitive learning and "continued to view as core knowledge Hebrew and Judaism's classical texts."

He developed a model of education that has also been called the "Protestant Model," because it followed the typical schooling model of Protestants in the United States, which separated general education and religious education. It is described as "a philosophical belief that state-funded schools should teach patriotism, civics, and critical skills while separate denominational-sponsored supplementary school should teach religious doctrine and practice."

== Benderly's own writings ==
- Benderly, Samson. "Jewish education in America." Jewish Education 20, no. 3 (1949): 80-86.
- Benderly, Samson. "Aims and Activities of the Bureau of Education of the Jewish Community (Kehillah) of New York, 1912." Jewish Education 20, no. 3 (1949): 92-109.
- Benderly, Samson. "The school man's viewpoint." Jewish Education 20, no. 3 (1949): 86-92.
- Benderly, Samson. "STANDARD CURRICULUM FOR JEWISH WEEK‐DAY RELIGIOUS SCHOOLS." Religious Education 11, no. 6 (1916): 526-531.
- Benderly, Samson. "LOUIS MARSHALL AND JEWISH EDUCATION (A PERSONAL APPRECIATION)." Jewish Education 1, no. 3 (1929): 144-147.
- Benderly, Samson. "The present status of Jewish religious education in New York city." Journal of Jewish Education 67, no. 3 (2001): 74-77.
- Benderly, Samson. "The Gary Plan and Jewish Education." Jewish Teacher 1 (1916): 41-47.
- Benderly, Samson. "The Jewish Educational Problem." The Maccabean (1903).

== Relevant literature ==
- Brickner, Rebecca A. "As I Remember Dr. Benderly." Jewish Education 20, no. 3 (1949): 53-59.
- Chipkin, Israel S. Dr. Samson Benderly, Reminiscences and Reflections. Jewish Education Volume 20, Issue 3: 21-52.
- Dinin, Samuel. "Samson Benderly—Educator." Jewish Education 20, no. 3 (1949): 33-37.
- Dushkin, Alexander. 1949, The Personality of Samson Benderly — His Life and Influence. Jewish Education Volume 20, Issue 3: 6-15.
- Ingall, Carol. 2010. The Women Who Reconstructed American Jewish Education, 1910-1965. Brandeis University Press.
- Krasner, Jonathan. 2011. The Benderly Boys and American Jewish Education. Brandeis University Press.
- Stern, Miriam Heller. ""A Dream Not Quite Come True:" Reassessing the Benderly Era in Jewish Education." Journal of Jewish Education 70, no. 3 (2004): 16-26.
- Stern, Miriam Heller. "The Benderly Boys & American Jewish Education." Journal of American Ethnic History 32, no. 3 (2013): 128-130.
- Winter, Nathan. 1966. Jewish Education in a Pluralist Society. New York University Press.
- Winter, Nathan Harold. 1963. The role of Samson Benderly in Jewish education in the United States. New York University.
