= Moshe Nathanson =

Cantor, composer, and musicologist

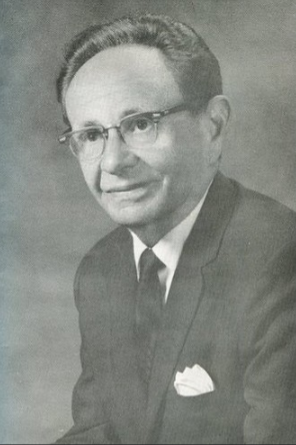

Personal life
- Born: 10 August 1899 Jerusalem, Mutasarrifate of Jerusalem, Ottoman Empire
- Died: 24 February 1981 (aged 81) Manhattan, New York, United States
- Buried: Mount Hebron Cemetery
- Spouse: Zipora Bor (m. 1924; died 1979)

Religious life
- Religion: Judaism

Jewish leader
- Position: Cantor
- Synagogue: Society for the Advancement of Judaism
- Began: 1924
- Ended: 1970

Moshe Nathanson (Hebrew: משה נתנזון; August 10, 1899 – February 24, 1981) was a Jerusalem-born American composer, cantor, and musicologist. He was known for promoting Hebrew folk music, and for composing widely used liturgical melodies, including a popular setting of the Birkat ha-Mazon. Alongside Abraham Zevi Idelsohn, he is sometimes credited as the composer of the popular song Hava Nagila.

== Biography ==
=== Early life and education ===
Nathanson was born on August 10, 1899, in Jerusalem, then part of the Ottoman Empire. His parents were Rabbi Naḥum Hirsch Nathanson and Rosa (née Silberstern) Nathanson. He was recognized as musically talented at a young age; by the age of eight he reportedly served as a ḥazzan in several Jerusalem synagogues.

At the age of ten, he transferred from a traditional ḥeder to the secular Hilfsverein Elementary School. There he joined the boys' choir directed by Abraham Zvi Idelsohn. By some accounts, Idelsohn assigned students to supply Hebrew text to a niggun that later became Hava Nagila, and Nathanson contributed the familiar verse from Psalm 118.

During World War I, Nathanson was recruited into the Ottoman Army and stationed in Damascus. In 1922 he left Jerusalem and immigrated to Canada to study law and music at McGill University. Shortly afterward he transferred to the Institute of Musical Art in New York City (now the Juilliard School of Music), from which he graduated in 1926.

=== Career ===
In 1924, Nathanson was hired by Mordecai M. Kaplan as cantor for the Society for the Advancement of Judaism, the first synagogue of the Reconstructionist movement. He held the position for almost fifty years.

During this period, he also worked with the Bureau of Jewish Education, taught at Orthodox day schools including the Yeshivah of Flatbush and the Crown Heights Yeshiva, and directed the music program at Camp Achvah, the first Hebrew-speaking sleepaway camp in the United States.

=== Personal life ===
Moshe married Zipora Bor on July 1, 1924, in Brooklyn, with whom he had three children: Deena Starr (January 16, 1931 – March 27, 2014), Naomi Brettler (born July 16, 1932), and Yaron Nathanson (July 22, 1926 – February 23, 2003). On February 24, 1981, Moshe Nathanson died at his home on 15 West 86th Street, in Manhattan. He was buried at Mount Hebron Cemetery alongside his wife Zipora who predeceased him.

== Publications and compositions ==
In 1939 Nathanson published Shirenu, a compilation of Hebrew songs intended for educational use in American Jewish settings. He later produced Sing Palestine in 1946, a four-record set featuring selections from Shirenu. Beginning in 1955 he published the multi-volume Zamru Lo, a collection of unaccompanied melodies designed for congregational singing.

Nathanson also wrote the widely used contemporary melody for the Birkat ha-Mazon, composed at Camp Achvah in the 1930s.
