= Samuel S. Cohon =

American rabbi (1888–1959)

Samuel Solomon Cohon (22 March 1888 – 22 August 1959) was an American rabbi and Chair of Theology at Hebrew Union College, a leader of American Reform Judaism in the mid-20th century.

== Biography ==
=== Early life ===
Cohon was born in Lohi (modern Belarusian: Лагі) Minsk Governorate – it is unknown in which of the two settlements named thus, whether the one Krupki Raion or at the Lahoysk Raion – then in the Russian Empire. His parents were Solomon Cohon, a shoemaker, and Rachel née Starobinetz. He was traditionally educated in yeshivas at Byerazino and the city of Minsk. In 1904, the sixteen-year-old Cohon immigrated to the United States,

He then chose a rabbinic career and began attending Hebrew Union College while studying concurrently for an A.B. in the University of Cincinnati. In HUC, he was a co-founder of the Ivriah Society, a club where several students and professors met to discuss matters of Hebrew culture and conversed only in that language. It was linked with the Cincinnati chapter of Poale Zion, serving as a small Zionist hub within the largely non-or-anti Zionist atmosphere. Cohon was ordained and joined the Central Conference of American Rabbis in 1912, being naturalized during the same year. On 12 June he married Angie Irma Reinhardt. His first post was in Congregation Oheb Zedakiah at Springfield, Ohio. In 1913 he transferred to Zion Congregation, Chicago, which he headed for six years. From 1919 to 1923 he served in the city's Temple Mizaph, which he founded himself. From 1920 he was also the director of the Chicago Jewish Normal School. He also opened a small seminary which soon developed into the Spertus Institute for Jewish Learning and Leadership.

=== Chair ===
In 1921, Rabbi Kaufmann Kohler retired from the presidency of Hebrew Union College, at the same time his wife was establishing herself as an expert on Jewish music. Kohler, a native of Fürth, symbolized the older generation of Reform rabbis who championed the rationalistic and ritually minimalist "Classical" era, embodied in the 1885 Pittsburgh Platform. A new strata of Eastern Europeans, who had more sympathy toward traditional mores, was rising through the ranks, like Solomon Freehof and Emanuel Gamoran. Cohon, prominent among them, was called to replace the departed president in the office of HUC Chair of Theology. At the time, most students paid little heed to the subject.

Cohon believed that the Classicists overemphasized morals and ethics, ignoring the important functions of ceremonial acts, practical observance and Jewish particularism, expressed in such elements as Hebrew prayer. He was deeply influenced by Ahad Ha'am and Mordecai Kaplan, who espoused basically Judaism as a Civilization and not a religious belief, though he never accepted it as such. He was one of the first to criticize the latter for reducing the role of faith to little more than an appendage to culture and folkways. Cohon, while agreeing that ethnic solidarity, a sense of continuing tradition and communal life were a major factor in Judaism, never renounced the doctrines of a personal God, divine revelation and the Election of Israel, as did Kaplan. He worked to introduce his philosophy into the Union of American Hebrew Congregations, where "Classical Reform", strongly identified with native Jews whose forebears arrived from Central Europe in the 1840s and 1850s, was losing ground to new immigrants from Russia and Poland. Already in 1923, he was responsible for authoring the Revised Union Haggadah, where he inserted more Hebrew and traditional texts in an early manifestation of his ideas. He also pioneered interest in Jewish mysticism, offering a course in Hasidism which was sparsely attended.

In the strictly theological sense, Cohon did not diverge much from Kohler, who based his own conception on that of Rabbi Abraham Geiger. Cohon maintained belief in an ongoing revelation of God's will, much en sync with the progress of human consciousness, reflected but not identical with scripture and the conventions of Judaism in the past. He offered a slight modification in the notion of Election, that was rejected by many contemporary thinkers, describing Israel as "God-choosing", though he stressed this was merely a semantic matter. As "God-choosing", the people accepted their universal mission to spread knowledge of Him among the nations, another precept he took whole from "Classical" theology. Cohon also basically affirmed the Immortality of the Soul, another idea that was not without opposition from some quarters, as a tendency for pure humanism was spreading among Reform clergy.

His convictions were of key importance as the movement shed Classicism in favour of a heightened sense of Jewish particularism and communality, laying the foundation for "New Reform Judaism". Cohon was chiefly interested in restoring a greater role to the collective over the personal sovereignty of the individual, a hallowed tenet of Reform. In 1931, Cohon published What We Jews Believe, a short primer aimed at initiating unlearned people at the basics of Judaism, in which he also conceitedly expressed his views.

=== Columbus 1937 ===
The decade saw the Great Depression, as many communities were short of collapse, the rise of antisemitism in Europe and an influx of immigrants' sons into UAHC, who were befuddled by Reform's advocacy of strict personal autonomy and sought a more coherent and concrete expression of religiosity. At the CCAR convention of 1935, it was recognized that most rabbis shared at least some of his sentiments, and it was obvious that the 1885 principles of Pittsburgh had little appeal. President Felix A. Levy formed a commission to compose a new platform, headed by the Rabbi Samuel Schulman. His draft was laden with statements largely based on "Classical" precepts, eliciting protests from other members of the CCAR. Schulman's style was highly intellectual and equivocal, in line with the Classical negation of any set dogma. Cohon opposed a definitive dogmatic approach as well, and rejected Levy's tentative proposal to author a comprehensive religious manual for daily practice, but he did espouse a concise and clear document that would give congregants something tangible to uphold. Himself a member of the commission, he announced that he would form his own version and present it later. In the 1936 convention, his propositions also encountered resistance. In 1937, Schulman attempted to recruit more supporters, but later resorted to opposing any binding new platform. The CCAR was split even between his and Cohon's motions, with exactly eighty-one in favour of each. Levy intervened and cast the deciding ballot for Cohon, turning the tide. In the concluding vote, the platform was adopted with only eight against.

The Guiding Principles of Reform Judaism, as the Columbus document was named, reflected its author's perception. It opened not with matters of belief, but with the declaration that "Judaism is the historical religious experience of the Jewish People". At the article titled "Religious Practice", he continued "it calls for faithful participation in the life of the Jewish community as it finds expression in home, synagogue and school... As a way of life requires in addition to its moral and spiritual demands... The retention and development of such customs, symbols and ceremonies as possess inspirational value, the cultivation of distinctive forms of religious art and music and the use of Hebrew." It also expressed clear support for Zionism: "In the rehabilitation of Palestine, we behold the promise of renewed life for many of our brethren. We affirm the obligation of all Jewry to aid in its upbuilding as a Jewish homeland."

In 1940, Cohon participated in the liturgy committee entrusted with the revision of the Union Prayer Book, including much more Hebrew and traditional formulae. In 1948, he published his seminal Judaism: A Way of Life. He lectured at many institutions and wrote many other monographs and articles. In 1956 he retired from his post as Chair of Theology but remained a research fellow, dying at Los Angeles three years later. He and Irma had one son, Baruch Joseph Cohon.
