= Abraham Zevi Idelsohn =

Jewish ethnologist and composer

- אַבְרָהָם צְבִי אידלסון
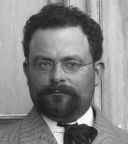
- Idelsohn in 1912
- Born: 11 June 1882; Feliksberg, Courland Governorate, Russian Empire (now Jūrkalne, Ventspils, Latvia)
- Died: 14 August 1938 (aged 56); Johannesburg, Transvaal Province, Union of South Africa (now in Gauteng, Republic of South Africa)
- Citizenship: South African
- Occupations: ethnomusicologist, composer
- Spouse: Tzilla Idelsohn
- Relatives: Joel Goodman Joffe (maternal grandson)

Abraham Zevi Idelsohn (Hebrew: אַבְרָהָם צְבִי אידלסון Avrohom Tzvi Idelsohn in Ashkenazi Hebrew; middle name also rendered Tzvi, Zvi, Zwi, or Zebi; June 11, 1882 – August 14, 1938) was a prominent Jewish ethnomusicologist and composer, who conducted several comprehensive studies of Jewish music around the world.

== Early life ==
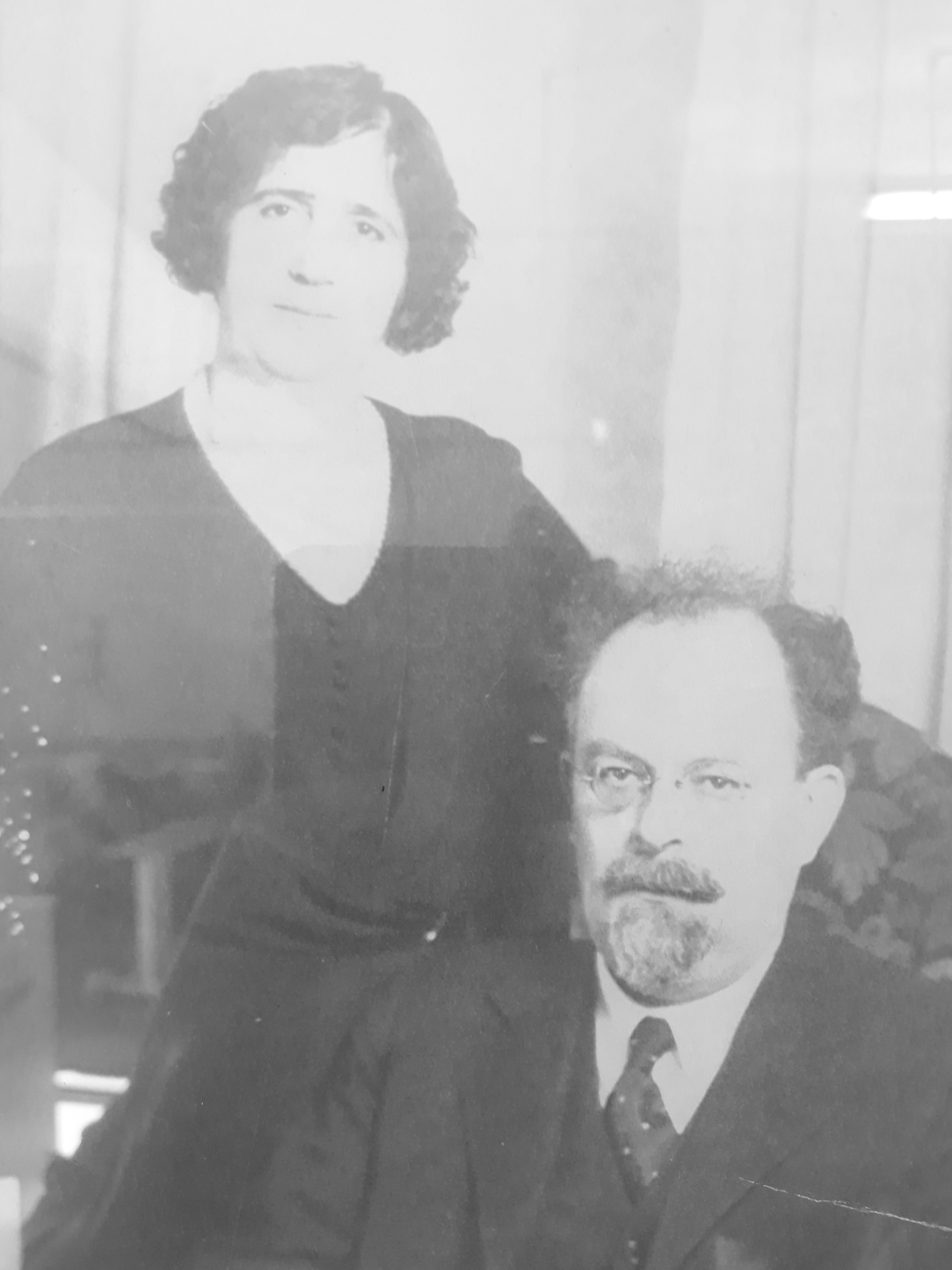
Portrait of Abraham and his spouse Tzilla Idelsohn c. 1935

Idelsohn was born on 11 June 1882 to Jewish parents in Feliksberg, a fisher hamlet in present-day Ventspils, Latvia (then part of the Russian Empire). His father was a Shochet and Hazzan in their district. When Idelsohn was less than six months old, the family moved to Libau (now Liepāja). There, due to the efforts of Philip Klein, Idelsohn's father was appointed overseer of kosher meat in a non-Jewish butchery. The young Idelsohn used to go with his father to a nearby choir school led by Abraham Mordecai Rabinovitz, who later became teacher to Idelsohn.

Idelsohn learnt the synagogal modes and “Zemiroth” as well as Jewish folk-songs from his father. At home, he received an orthodox education and "appreciation for everything Jewish". At the age of 12, he was sent to Lithuanian yeshivas, where he remained five years. Upon his return home, he decided to take an examination at the Gymnasium and prepare for "an intelligent profession". He secured a tutor and started studying.

== Career ==
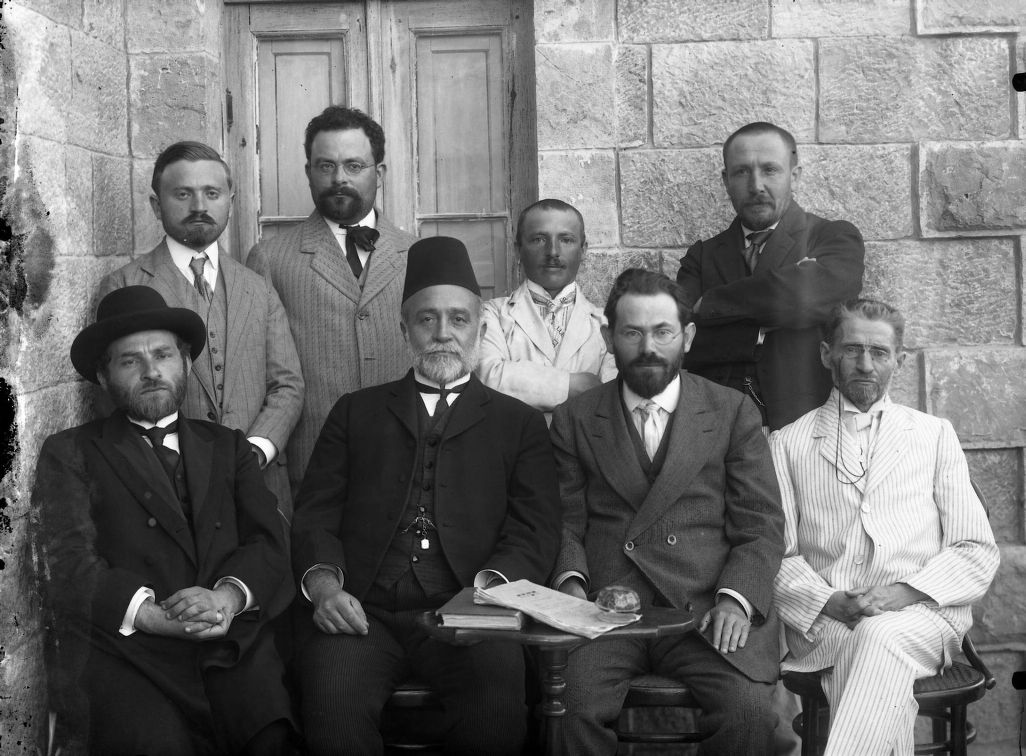
Idelsohn (standing second from left) at the First Committee of the Hebrew Language in Jerusalem (1912)

He began his study of Jewish music in Libau, and was trained to be a Hazzan (cantor). He worked briefly in Imperial Germany and the Union of South Africa. In 1905, he emigrated to the Mutasarrifate of Jerusalem (part of historic Palestine under the Ottoman Empire). In 1919, during the OETA era, he established a school of Jewish music there.

In 1922 he moved to Cincinnati, Ohio, USA to take a position as professor of Jewish music at Hebrew Union College. In September 1929, he visited his family in Johannesburg (then in the Union of South Africa) for his parents’ golden wedding anniversary. During his time there, he gave talks on Jewish music as well as the nature, principles and procedures of Progressive Judaism. He urged his brother, Jerry, to establish a group to initiate Progressive Judaism in Johannesburg. In June 1931, the South African Jewish Religious Union for Liberal Judaism was established with Jerry as honorary secretary, and a wide media campaign was launched. Eventually, the South African Progressive Judaism. came into being.

He is also famous for being the first researcher to document the folk music of Syrian Jews.

Idelsohn is generally acknowledged as the “father” of modern Jewish musicology, despite his publishing starting after that of Angie Irma Cohon. During his time in Jerusalem, he noted a great diversity of musical traditions among the Jews living in the region. Idelsohn examined these traditional melodies and found recurring motifs and progressions that were not found in any other national music. This suggested a common origin for musical phrases that went back to Israel/Palestine in the first century CE. He found that these motifs fell into three distinct tonal centers, which corresponded to the Dorian, Phrygian, and Lydian modes of the ancient Greeks. Each of these modes elicited a distinct psycho-emotional response. The Dorian Mode was used for texts of an elevated and inspired nature; the Phrygian for sentimental texts, with their very human outbreaks of feeling, both of joy and grief; and the Lydian was used in composing music for the texts of lamenting and confessions of sins. Idelsohn further categorized and defined these motives as ones that either prepared a musical phrase, began it, or concluded it.

He was also the music teacher to Moshe Nathanson, a well-known Jewish composer who is known to be the author of the lyrics to the famous Jewish folk song "Hava Nagila."

== Works ==
His works include the monumental Thesaurus of Hebrew Oriental Melodies (10 volumes, 1914–1932), Jewish Music (1929), and a collaboration with Cohon on Harvest Festivals, A Children’s Succoth Celebration.

== Death ==
Idelsohn died in Johannesburg on 14 August 1938, at the age of 56.

== Descendents ==
Idelsohn's maternal grandson was Joel Goodman Joffe (Baron Joffe) (1932-2017).

== Sources ==
- Adler, Israel; Bathja, Bayer; Schleifer, Elijahu, eds. (1986). The Abraham Zvi Idelsohn Memorial Volume. YUVAL. Studies of the jewish music research centre. Vol. 5. Jerusalem: The Magnes Press. ISSN 0084-439X.
- Works by and about Abraham Zevi Idelsohn in University Library JCS Frankfurt am Main: Digital Collections Judaica
- Idelsohn at the Encyclopædia Britannica
- On-line access to Thesaurus of Hebrew Oriental Melodies: English edition, omitting vols 3–5
- Hebrew edition, vols 1–5 only
