= Hava Nagila =

Jewish traditional folk song in Hebrew

"Hava Nagila"
MIDI instrumental performance

"Hava Nagila" (Hebrew: הָבָה נָגִילָה, romanized: Hāvā Nāgīlā, lit. 'Let us rejoice') is a Jewish folk song. It is traditionally sung at celebrations, such as weddings, bar and bat mitzvahs, and other Jewish holidays among the Jewish community. Written in 1918, it quickly spread through the Jewish diaspora.

== History ==
The melody is based on a Hassidic Nigun. It was composed in 1918 to celebrate the Balfour Declaration and the British victory over the Ottomans in 1917. It was first performed in a mixed choir concert in Jerusalem.

Abraham Zevi Idelsohn (1882–1938), a professor at Hebrew University, began cataloging all known Jewish music and teaching classes in musical composition. One of his students was a promising cantorial student, Moshe Nathanson, who with the rest of his class was presented by the professor with a slow, melodious, 19th-century chant (niggun or nigun) and assigned to add rhythm and words to fashion a modern Hebrew song. There are competing claims as to who composed "Hava Nagila", with both Idelsohn and Nathanson being suggested.

The niggun has been attributed to the Sadigurer Chasidim, who lived in what is now Ukraine. This version has been recreated by Daniel Gil, based on a traditional song collected by Susman Kiselgof. The text was probably refined by Idelsohn. Members of the community began to immigrate to Jerusalem in 1915, and Idelsohn wrote in 1932 that he had been inspired by that melody.

== Lyrics ==
Transliteration	Hebrew text	English text
Hava nagila	הָבָה נָגִילָה	Let's rejoice
Hava nagila	הָבָה נָגִילָה	Let's rejoice
Hava nagila ve-nismeḥa	הָבָה נָגִילָה וְנִשְׂמְחָה	Let's rejoice and be happy
	(repeat)
Hava neranenah	הָבָה נְרַנְּנָה	Let's sing
Hava neranenah	הָבָה נְרַנְּנָה	Let's sing
Hava neranenah ve-nismeḥa	הָבָה נְרַנְּנָה וְנִשְׂמְחָה	Let's sing and be happy
	(repeat)
Uru, uru aḥim!	עוּרוּ, עוּרוּ אַחִים!	Awake, awake, brothers!
Uru aḥim be-lev sameaḥ	עוּרוּ אַחִים בְּלֵב שָׂמֵחַ	Awake brothers with a happy heart
	(repeat line three times)
Uru aḥim, uru aḥim!	עוּרוּ אַחִים, עוּרוּ אַחִים!	Awake, brothers, awake, brothers!
Be-lev sameaḥ	בְּלֵב שָׂמֵחַ	With a happy heart
	repeat (optional)

== Notable performers ==
- Israeli folk duo Ran & Nama (Ran Eliran and Nechama Hendel) released what is likely the earliest recording of the version that was later made famous throughout the world, on their album Ran & Nama – The First Record (Hed Arzi AN-42-70, 1959).
- Singer Harry Belafonte is known for his version of the song, which was recorded for his album Belafonte at Carnegie Hall, recorded at the titular Carnegie Hall in 1959. He rarely gave a concert without singing it, and stated that the two "stand out" songs from his professional career were "The Banana Boat Song" and "Hava Nagila". Belafonte noted and claimed, "Life is not worthwhile without it. Most Jews in America learned that song from me."
- Aliza Kashi recorded the song for her 1963 album A Internacional Aliza Kashi (The International Aliza Kashi).
- Laurindo Almeida
- The Barry Sisters recorded this song on their Greatest Yiddish Hits album, released on 16 October 1965.
- Raphael, the Spanish singer and actor, recorded "Hava Nagila" in 1968.
- Nissim Black, a Jewish Orthodox rapper, recorded an adaptation titled "The Hava Song".
- Bruno Blum included an instrumental ska section of the song in his version of French singer-songwriter Georges Brassens' "La Mauvaise Réputation" [Bad Reputation] on his 2002 album Think Différent.
- Brave Combo
- Glen Campbell released "True Grit/Hava Nagila" on Capitol Records in 1969.
- David Carroll
- John Lennon and Yoko Ono sang "Hava Nagila" during their 1969 Bed-In.
- Jasper Carrott (on his 1976 album, Carrott in Notts)
- Chubby Checker
- Herman Clebanoff
- Carmela Corren – Israeli singer
- Celia Cruz
- Dick Dale and the Del Tones published a (surf rock) rendition in 1963.
- Dalida, 1959
- Neil Diamond, in addition to having performed Hava Nagila in his 1994 Live In America concert, incorporated it into The Jazz Singer, based on Samson Raphaelson's play, in which he acted out a cantor with popular-music ambitions.
- George Lam published a Cantonese adaption of the song in 1987, named "Ecstasy" (狂歡).
- Dream Theater performed a cover of "Hava Nagila" in Tel Aviv, Israel, on 16 June 2009.
- Bob Dylan performed the song as "Talkin' Hava Negeilah Blues" during the early 1960s. One such rendition appears on The Bootleg Series Volumes 1–3 (Rare & Unreleased) 1961–1991.
- The E Street Band with guest accordionists performed it at a Bruce Springsteen concert in Sunrise, Florida, on 9 September 2009.
- Percy Faith
- Irving Fields
- Four Jacks and a Jill released a version of the song on their 1965 album, Jimmy Come Lately.
- Connie Francis
- Lionel Hampton
- Lena Horne, "Now!" (US #92, 1963)
- Abraham Zevi Idelsohn published the Hebrew song book, Sefer Hashirim, in 1922, which includes the first publication of his arrangement of "Hava Nagila". He also produced the first commercial recording in 1922, on the Polyphon record label ("Order No. 8533"), as part of a series which recorded 39 Hebrew folk songs.
- Los Iracundos
- Kare and the Cavemen
- Bert Kaempfert
- Harold Land
- James Last
- Abbe Lane
- Jon Lord of Deep Purple included Hava Nagila in his solo keyboard improvisations as heard on Made in Europe (1975).
- Arthur Lyman
- Betty Madigan, "Dance Everyone Dance" (US #31, 1958)
- Shelly Manne
- Mantovani
- Me First and the Gimme Gimmes, who recorded the song live for the album Ruin Jonny's Bar Mitzvah. They also recorded a second version on the same album to the tune of Feliz Navidad.
- Pérez Prado
- Flora Purim
- Ivan Rebroff
- Frank Slay and his Orchestra, "Flying Circle" (US #45, 1962)
- The Spotnicks
- Pete Townshend, whose ability to play the song was instrumental to his induction in The Who.
- Richard Tucker
- Caterina Valente
- Rika Zaraï
- Helmut Lotti in his album "Helmut Lotti Goes Classic II - The Blue Album (Live)".
- Mik Kaminski of Electric Light Orchestra performed a violin solo that included Hava Nagila in the band's 1977 tour promoting their 1976 album A New World Record
- Party Animals, with a happy hardcore remix in 1996.
- Scooter, with a similar happy hardcore remix, titled Last Minute.
- Charles Aznavour with Enrico Macias in 1973

== Use in sports ==
=== Association football ===
==== Ajax Amsterdam ====
Supporters of the Dutch association football club AFC Ajax, although not an official Jewish club, commonly use Jewish imagery. A central part of Ajax fans' culture, "Hava Nagila" can often be heard sung in the stadium by the team's supporters, and at one point ringtones of "Hava Nagila" could even be downloaded from the club's official website.

==== Tottenham Hotspur ====
Supporters of the English football club Tottenham Hotspur commonly refer to themselves as "Yids" and say they are strongly associated with Jewish symbolism and culture. "Hava Nagila" has been adopted as an anthem of sorts by the club, and was one of the most frequently sung songs at the team's former stadium at White Hart Lane.

=== Gymnastics ===
In the 2012 Summer Olympics floor exercise final, Aly Raisman placed first with a score of 15.600, becoming the first American woman to win a gold medal on the floor exercise. She performed to the tune of "Hava Nagila".

== See also ==
- Hora (dance)
- Jewish music
- Music of Israel
- Zum Gali Gali
