= Ephraim Kanarfogel =

American historian

Personal life
- Born: November 19, 1955 (age 70)
- Education: Yeshiva University

Religious life
- Religion: Judaism
- Denomination: Orthodox Judaism

Jewish leader
- Position: University Professor of Jewish History, Literature, and Law
- Organisation: Bernard Revel Graduate School, Stern College for Women, Yeshiva University
- Residence: Teaneck, New Jersey
- Semikhah: RIETS

Military service
- Rank: E. Billi Ivry University Professor of Jewish History, Literature, and Law

Ephraim (Fred) Kanarfogel (born November 19, 1955) is a professor and dean at Yeshiva University and one of the foremost experts in the fields of medieval Jewish history and rabbinic literature, as well as an ordained rabbi and Torah scholar.

== Education ==
Nearly all of Kanarfogel's formal education took place at Yeshiva University: He attended Yeshiva University's Marsha Stern Talmudical Academy for high school, and earned his BA from Yeshiva College and both an MA and PhD from the Bernard Revel Graduate School of Jewish Studies. Kanarfogel also received rabbinical ordination from the Rabbi Isaac Elchanan Theological Seminary (an affiliate of the university), in one of the last classes taught directly by Rabbi Dr. Joseph B. Soloveitchik.

== Career ==
A native of White Plains, New York, Kanarfogel practiced as a pulpit rabbi for Congregation Beth Aaron, then a growing, youthful synagogue in Teaneck, New Jersey, from 1984 to 2003. In 1979, Kanarfogel began teaching at the university, and was soon recognized as the E. Billi Ivry Professor of Jewish History at Yeshiva's Stern College for Women. In 1984, he became the head of the Jewish Studies program at Stern and was later appointed chairman of the Rebecca Ivry Department of Jewish Studies and director of the Graduate Program for Women in Advanced Talmudic Studies (GPATS) at Yeshiva University. Named the Ivry University Professor of Jewish History, Literature, and Law in 2013, he also teaches and directs doctoral dissertations at the Bernard Revel Graduate School of Jewish Studies.

Kanarfogel has authored or edited eleven books and published nearly 100 articles and reviews. Some of his works have been translated to Hebrew.

== Awards ==
In 2002, Kanarfogel became the first person to win Yeshiva University's Samuel Belkin Literary Award on multiple occasions. He was also awarded the National Jewish Book award in 1994 for his first book, Jewish Education and Society in the High Middle Ages.

== Personal ==
Kanarfogel currently resides in Teaneck, New Jersey. He and his wife, optometrist Dr. Devorah Kanarfogel, have six children and twelve grandchildren. Kanarfogel plays the piano/keyboard, is an avid rail fan, and in his youth was a star lefty softball pitcher at Camp Massad.

== Authored books ==
- Jewish education and society in the High Middle Ages. Detroit: Wayne State University Press, 1992. (A Hebrew translation of this book, by Ruti Bar-Ilan, was published by the Kibbutz Ha-Me'uchad Press in 2003.)
- Peering through the lattices: mystical, magical, and pietistic dimensions in the Tosafist period. Detroit : Wayne State University Press, c2000. In this volume he disputes classically accepted views held about the Tosafists, and shows that many were interested in mysticism. (A Hebrew translation of this book, by Ruti Bar-Ilan, was published by Merkaz Shazar in 2011.)
- The Intellectual History and Rabbinic Culture of Medieval Ashkenaz. Detroit: Wayne State University Press, 2013.
- Brothers from Afar: Rabbinic Approaches to Apostasy and Reversion in Medieval Europe. Detroit: Wayne State University Press, 2021

== Edited books ==
- Between Rashi and Maimonides: Studies in Medieval Jewish Thought, Literature, and Exegesis. New York : Ktav, 2010.
- Regional Identities and Cultures of Medieval Jews. London: Littman Library of Jewish Civilization, 2018.
- Scholarly Man of Faith: Studies in the Thought and Writings of Rabbi Joseph B. Soloveitchik. Urim, 2018.
