= Camp Achvah =

Camp Achvah מַחֲנֶה אַחֲוָה

Location
- Averne, New York (1927–8); Godeffroy, New York (from 1929)

Information
- Type: Jewish summer camp
- Founded: 1927
- Founder: Samson Benderly
- Authority: New York Bureau of Jewish Education
- Gender: Co-educational
- Language: Hebrew

Camp Achvah (Hebrew: מַחֲנֶה אַחֲוָה, romanized: Maḥaneh Aḥva) was the first Hebrew-speaking summer camp in North America.

== History ==
Achvah was founded in 1927 at Averne, Long Island by Samson Benderly, then director of the New York Bureau of Jewish Education, as a summer camp for members of his Kvutzah fellowship program. The Dalton Plan-inspired program, which at its height included about fifty members, brought together a select group of graduating high school students for Jewish study and leadership training. The camp moved to a one-hundred-acre site in Godeffroy, New York, in 1929.

Unique to the camp at the time was its immersive Hebrew environment, which resulted in high rates of fluency. Along with sports, music, and dramatics, Achvah's curriculum included Hebrew debating clubs and reading circles. The camp was also known for its mass pageants, including the dramatization of several tragic events in Jewish history for Tisha B'Av.

With the onset of the Great Depression, and the dissolution of the Kvutzah in 1932, Achvah opened up as an ordinary summer camp to all Jewish elementary and secondary students. It ceased operating entirely in Hebrew, and began focusing on informal Jewish and Zionist education in place of formal study. By 1936 Achvah had a population of over 500 children.

== Notable alumni ==
- Bella Abzug
- Moshe Nathanson
- Isaiah Zeldin

== See also ==
- Camp Massad (Poconos)
