= Sandra Kolber =

Sandra Kolber, née Maizel (1934-2001) was a Canadian writer and philanthropist, most noted as a recipient of the Ramon John Hnatyshyn Award from the Governor General's Performing Arts Awards in 1994.

A graduate of McGill University, she was the wife of lawyer and later senator Leo Kolber. She published two poetry collections in the 1960s, Bitter Sweet Lemons and Love (1967) and All There Is of Love (1969).

She later worked in film and television, including stints on the boards of the National Film Board of Canada, Cineplex Odeon and the Canadian Broadcasting Corporation, and as a founding vice-president of Canadian International Studios. She wrote the screenplay for the drama film Tell Me That You Love Me, had creative consulting credits on the films Hard Feelings, Porky's and Love Songs (Paroles et musique), and was a producer of the animated children's film George and the Christmas Star.

She served as president of the Sandra and Leo Kolber Foundation, and was a patron of various cultural organizations including the Montreal Museum of Fine Arts, the Royal Ontario Museum, the Stratford Festival, the Centaur Theatre, the Canadian Centre for Architecture and the Montreal Symphony Orchestra. She was also an active fundraiser for various Jewish charities, including the Jewish National Fund and the Jewish Rehabilitation Hospital.

She was named a member of the Order of Canada in 1993.
