= Angie Irma Cohon =

Angie Irma Cohon (née Reinhart, born September, 1890, Portland, Oregon, died 1991) was a Jewish author and educator, known for her seminal book, Introduction to Jewish Music in Eight Illustrated Lectures.

== Early life and education ==
Born to parents J.F. and Amelia (Marks) Reinhart in 1890, Cohon lived in Portland, Oregon until moving to Ohio at 19 to attend the Hebrew Union College. She transferred to the University of Cincinnati, earning a bachelor's degree in 1912.

On June 12 of the same year she graduated, Cohon married Rabbi Samuel S. Cohon. They had one son, Baruch Joseph.

== Works and legacy ==
Cohon wrote poetry. One of her early books, A Brief Jewish Ritual, was published by Women of Mizpah in 1921.

Most notably, however, were Cohon's contributions of the field of Jewish music in the English language. The National Council on Jewish Women published Introduction to Jewish Music in Eight Illustrated Lectures, with a second edition coming out in 1923. This work became a basis for the council's study of music for nearly 30 years.

She collaborated with another contributor to the field, A.Z. Idelssohn, on Harvest Festivals, A Children’s Succoth Celebration.

The American Jewish Archives in Cincinnati houses Cohon's papers and music manuscripts.

The Rabbi Samuel S. and A. Irma Cohon Memorial Foundation Award, named for Cohon and her husband, "honors individuals for outstanding service to the entire Jewish people in the areas of rescue, unity, education or the creative arts." Irma's son has served as the chief financial officer, while her grandson has served president of the Cohon Memorial Foundation.
