= Victor Rabinovitch =

Victor Rabinovitch was the President and Chief Executive Officer of the Canadian Museum of Civilization Corporation (2000 – 2011), which is responsible for two of Canada’s national museums: the Canadian Museum of Civilization and the Canadian War Museum.

Before joining the Corporation, Rabinovitch was Assistant Deputy Minister, Income Security Programs, at Human Resources Development Canada, a department of the federal government. This Branch is responsible for the administration of the national public pension programs in Canada's social security system (Old Age Security, Guaranteed Income Supplement, the Canada Pension Plan and the CPP Disability pension).

From 1995 to 1998, Rabinovitch served as Assistant Deputy Minister, Cultural Development and Heritage, in the Department of Canadian Heritage. He was responsible for policies and programs in broadcasting, cinema, publishing, sound recording, copyright, museums and performing arts. He led the departmental team responsible for the modernization of Canada's Copyright Act, and the implementation of programs to assist book publishing, film and television production, museums and national cultural training institutions.

Rabinovitch began his federal public service career in 1982 as a member of the Task Force on Atlantic Fisheries. He subsequently became an Assistant Deputy Minister at Fisheries and Oceans Canada, where he served in a variety of capacities including economic policy, inspection, enforcement and international relations. He was also the senior public servant responsible for the efforts by Canada to stop foreign over-fishing.

Before joining the federal public service, Rabinovitch specialized in labour issues, serving as National Secretary for Workplace Health and Safety with the Canadian Labour Congress from 1978 to 1982. From 1976 to 1978, he served as executive director, Manitoba Department of Labour.

Rabinovitch holds a B.A. in Economics and Political Science from McGill University and a Doctorate from Sussex University in England. His publications include: “Method and Success in Canada's Cultural Policies” in the Queen's Quarterly (Summer, 1999) and “Museums Facing the Trudeau Challenge” in Canadian Issues (October, 2003). He is a Fellow of the School of Policy Studies at Queen's University; Board member of the City of Gatineau Economic Development Corporation; Chairman, Friends of the International Council for Canadian Studies; and a member of the Canadian Art Museum Directors’ Organization.

Rabinovitch was named CEO of the Year in the para-public sector by the Regroupement des gens d’affaires de la Capitale nationale in 2005. In October 2006, he received the Award of Merit from the Association for Canadian Studies for his outstanding contribution, and that of the Canadian Museum of Civilization, to the dissemination of knowledge of Canada’s history. He is married with two children.
