= Denis Marleau =

Canadian director

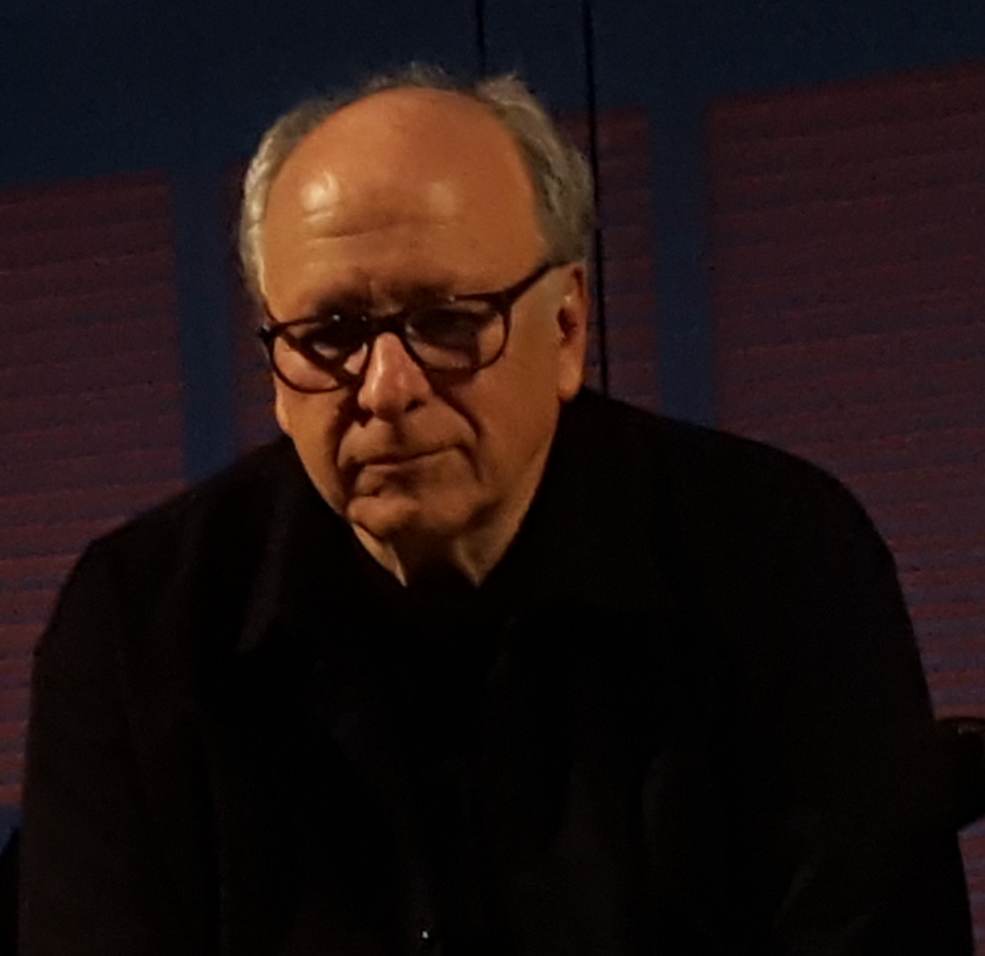

Denis Marleau (born October 14, 1954) is a Canadian director living in Quebec.

He was born in Salaberry-de-Valleyfield and trained as an actor at the Conservatoire d'art dramatique de Montréal. He then spent two years in Europe, interning in corporal mime and working at the Mandragore Theatre. Marleau returned to Quebec and founded the Théâtre de la Nouvelle Lune with several other actors. In 1981, he presented Coeur à gaz et autres textes Dada at the Musée d'art contemporain de Montréal. In 1982, he founded Le Théâtre Ubu with Anne-Marie Rocher and Denis Leclerc; Marleau was the company's artistic director and resident stage director. During the 1980s, he presented several collage works based on European avant-garde texts, including Merz Opéra and Oulipo Show. During the 1990s, he produced several plays based on literary works not familiar to people in Quebec as well as plays by Normand Chaurette and Maurice Maeterlinck. Maeterlinck's Les aveugles was particularly successful. He also served as French theatre artistic director for the National Arts Centre in Ottawa.

He founded the Laboratoires du Théâtre français, associated with the National Arts Centre, which provides education in theatre. He has also organized theatre workshops in Canada, Europe and Mexico. He has published articles in various periodicals dedicated to theatre.

Marleau received Governor General's Performing Arts Awards in 1998 (National Arts Centre Award) and 2012 (Lifetime Achievement). He was named an Officer in the Order of Canada, a Chevalier in the National Order of Quebec and a Chevalier in the French Ordre des Arts et des Lettres. He has received several awards from the Association québécoise des critiques de théâtre. Marleau was awarded the Prix Denise-Pelletier in 2014.
