= Camp Massad (Montreal) =

Jewish summer camp school in Quebec, Canada

Camp Massad of Canada
- מַחֲנֶה מַסָד
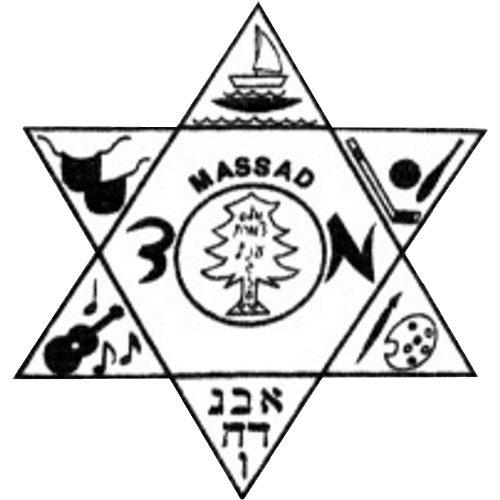

Location
- 1780 Chemin du Lac Quenouille; Sainte-Agathe-des-Monts, Quebec, J8C 0R4
- Coordinates: 46.15035°N 74.36560°W

Information
- Former name: Massad Alef
- Type: Jewish summer camp
- Religious affiliation: Judaism
- Established: April 11, 1947; 78 years ago
- Director: Jennifer Turack
- Gender: Co-educational
- Age range: 7–16
- Language: Hebrew
- Affiliation: FJC, OCA
- Alumni: Massadniks
- Website: campmassad.org

Camp Massad of Canada (Hebrew: מַחֲנֶה מַסָד, Maḥaneh Massad) is a Zionist Jewish summer camp in Sainte-Agathe-des-Monts, Quebec, with headquarters in Montreal. It was founded in 1947, with the creation of Massad Alef on Lac Quenouille in the Laurentian Mountains. At its peak Massad had nearly 400 campers.

Camp Massad has a long tradition of Hebrew language immersion. It is shomer Shabbat and has a kosher kitchen under the supervision of the Montreal Va'ad Ha'ir. Massad attracts campers of various Jewish backgrounds from Montreal and other parts of Canada, various cities in the United States, Israel, and many other places throughout the world. Camp Massad is a member of the Foundation for Jewish Camp and the Ontario Camps Association.

== History ==
=== Early history ===
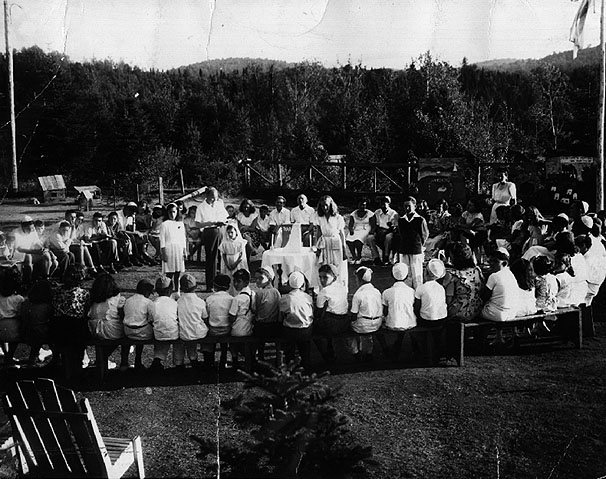
Open air Shabbat service at Massad in 1947

Camp Massad was founded in 1947 by the Keren Hatarbut Ha'Ivri under the leadership of Aron Horowitz and a small group of Canadian Hebraists. Horowitz had previously founded Camp T'chiyah in Calgary in 1944, the first Hebrew-speaking summer camp in Canada. Massad's first president, Isaac Gold, invested three thousand dollars as a deposit for a camp-site at Lac Quenouille in the Laurentians. With the assistance of Gold and other philanthropists, Massad grew from a small camp-site with no pier, no level ground for sports, few showers, a short supply of drinking water, and one hall for both dining and activities.

In its first summer, Massad had eighty campers. In the camp's second season the number applicants more than doubled, and Massad could only accept 150 campers. Campers were divided into four age groups: Chalutsim, Olim, Bonim, and Shomrim. Following the Histadrut HaNoar Ha'Ivri's American Massad movement, the groups were soon renamed Shoresh (Hebrew: שׁוֹרֶשׁ, lit. 'root'), Geza (Hebrew: גֶזַע, lit. 'trunk'), Anaf (Hebrew: עָנָף, lit. 'branch'), and Tzameret (Hebrew: צַמֶרֶת, lit. 'tree-top').

=== Growth and development ===
With the success of Massad Alef, a second Massad camp, Massad Bet, was opened by the Keren Hatarbut in 1950 in the Muskoka region north of Toronto under the directorship of David Taub, with the assistance of Massad Alef alumni. The new camp, lacking in funding and witness to constant turnovers of camp directors, was closed in 1977. Massad Gimmel in Winnipeg was officially incorporated as a branch of the Hebrew Camps Massad of Canada in 1962.

In 1955, with backing from the Jewish Agency, Keren Hatarbut established a Machon l'Madrichim (Hebrew: מָכוֹן לְמַדְרִיכִים, lit. 'Leadership Institute'; or Hebrew: מל״ם, romanized: Malam) program for youth leaders from Hebrew high schools across Canada in conjunction with Camp Massad and the Hebrew Youth Movement. The Machon program consisted of three summers of extensive training, along with the requirement of attending the National Leadership Institute in the city throughout the three years. Graduates served as leaders and counsellors in all three Massad camps, and at other Canadian Zionist youth movements. Originally, the first month of the summer program was held at Massad Bet, and the second at Massad Alef. The Machon program was moved to Massad Alef after its first year, primarily because of inadequate facilities at Massad Bet. Registration for the second year had reached fifty. In 1958, Massad held its first trip to Israel, becoming the first Hebrew-speaking youth group from the Diaspora to visit Israel.

In 1959, Aron Horowitz proposed the building of a second unit across the road from the original camp-site for the accommodation of Massad and Machon l'Madrichim's growth. Galil was opened in time for the 1959 season. Camps Emek and Galil were two self-sufficient camps, the former for elementary school students, the latter for high school students, who entered the Machon program at age fourteen. By 1963, Emek and Galil had a total of 249 campers, 108 of whom were members of the Machon l'Madrichim. The number rose to about 370 campers in the mid-1960s.

=== Late 20th century ===
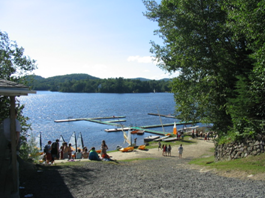
The Agam, in the Emek section of Massad

In 1964 the Keren Hatarbut was absorbed by the United Zionist Council, and again by the Zionist Organization of Canada under the Canadian Zionist Federation in 1971. Massad, left without the aid of the Keren Hatarbut, lost its financial backing. Massad Alef's enrolment had fallen to sixty children in 1971, though it had picked up to ninety-five in 1973. In 1974 the Zionist Organization of Canada resolved to close Camp Massad, to the shock of camp leadership and the Canadian Jewish community. A group of Massad alumni led by David Finestone and Moe Bauman prevented the closure by incorporating Massad as an independent company, ensuring it would not be included in the Zionist Organization of Canada's take-over of the Keren Hatarbut.

In the mid-1970s, the Galil ulam (named after Isaac Gold) collapsed, fire had taken some bunks, and most of the facilities were in need of repair and renovation. The Canadian Zionist Federation and Allied Jewish Community rejected pleas for assistance. Nonetheless, Massad succeeded in improving its facilities and increasing enrolment. The summer of 1974 saw 143 campers and a staff of 38.

=== Recent history ===
Though the camp no longer enforces total immersion of campers in Hebrew, Camp Massad remains a strongly Hebrew-speaking, Zionist camp. Along with Camp Massad in Manitoba (formerly Massad Gimmel), Camp Massad is the only remaining camp of the Massad movement and its American counterpart.

== Activities ==
The summer is climaxed by the Maccabiah colour war, where the camp is divided into two teams competing against each other in sport and spirit, and Ma'apilim, a night-time re-enactment of Jewish immigration during the Aliyah Bet.

== Notable alumni ==
- Bernard Avishai (1949– ), writer
- Irwin Cotler OC (1940– ), Minister of Justice
- Charles Dalfen (1943–2009), chairman of the CRTC
- Gilah Yelin Hirsch (1944– ), artist
- Gad Horowitz (1936– ), political scientist
- Chaviva Hošek OC (1946– ), academic and politician
- Henry Morgentaler CM (1923–2013), camp doctor
- Allan Nadler (1954– ), academic
- Mark J. Poznansky CM (1946– ), scientist
- Linda Rabin CM (1946– ), dancer and choreographer
- Robert Rabinovitch (1943– ), President of the CBC
- Victor Rabinovitch, museum director
- Ariel Helwani, (1982– ), sports journalist
- David Roskies (1948– ), literary scholar
- William Shatner OC (1931– ), actor
- Morton Weinfeld (1949– ), sociologist
- Ruth Wisse (1936– ), literary scholar

== See also ==
- Camp Massad (Manitoba)
- Camp Massad (Poconos)
