= Samuel Beer =

American political scientist (1911–2009)

Samuel Hutchison Beer (July 28, 1911 – April 7, 2009) was an American political scientist who specialized in the government and politics of the United Kingdom. He was a longtime professor at Harvard University and served as president of the Americans for Democratic Action in the early 1960s.

== Early life and education ==
Beer was born in Bucyrus, Ohio to William Cameron and Jess Beer. His father was an attorney. His mother died when Samuel was quite young. Beer attended Staunton Military Academy with Barry Goldwater, and the two played on the school's football team. After his graduation from the University of Michigan, he attended Balliol College, Oxford, on a Rhodes Scholarship, where he was awarded a degree in history.

Upon his return to the United States, Beer worked for the Democratic National Committee and wrote speeches for President Franklin D. Roosevelt in the mid-1930s. He also was a reporter for The New York Post and Fortune. He then attended graduate school at Harvard University, earning a doctorate in political science in 1943. During World War II, Beer served in the United States Army artillery and was awarded a Bronze Star for his heroism during the D-Day Normandy landings. After the war, he was part of the Allied Military Government in Germany and eventually left the Army with the rank of captain.

== Teaching and published works ==
At the conclusion of his military service in 1946, he joined the faculty of Harvard University. There, he became one of Harvard's most popular and iconic professors, teaching its undergraduates "Western Thought and Institutions" for more than three decades, a course that covered European history, philosophy, and politics by examining six of history's revolutions in great detail—the twelfth century clash between church and state that resulted in Magna Carta; the Protestant Reformation of the early sixteenth century; the English revolution of the mid-seventeenth century; the French Revolution; the British Age of Reform of the early nineteenth century; and the rise and fall of Nazi Germany in the twentieth century.

Beer published several books in his field, including his first in 1949, The City of Reason, which advocated a political approach predicated on the philosophy of Alfred North Whitehead. He was elected a Fellow of the American Academy of Arts and Sciences in 1955. His 1956 book, Treasury Control, documented fiscal policy in the UK. In 1965, British Politics in the Collectivist Age considered the conflict between liberal and conservative approaches in the UK following World War II. Britain Against Itself: The Political Contradictions of Collectivism (1982) analyzed the UK in the Thatcher era. He focused on the US in To Make a Nation: The Rediscovery of American Federalism (1993) about American political theory.

Following his retirement from Harvard in 1982, Beer served on the faculties of both Boston College and Dartmouth College. He was also a senior scholar at the Woodrow Wilson International Center for Scholars.

== Cultural notes ==
Samuel Beer shared a birthday with Jacqueline Kennedy, July 28, and served as a political advisor to John F. Kennedy. The subject of Kennedy's first book, Why England Slept—one based upon his senior honors' thesis as an undergraduate at Harvard in the class of 1940—touched upon Beer's area of specialization, modern British politics, and Kennedy would have met Beer while serving as Harvard overseer during the 1950s. Beer proudly wore a gold "JFK" tie clasp, a gift from the late president, to work every day.

== Personal ==
Beer died at age 97 at his home in Washington, D.C. He was survived by Jane K. Brooks, his second wife, two daughters, and two stepdaughters; six grandchildren; three step-grandchildren; and one great-grandchild.
