= Camp Massad (Poconos) =

Jewish summer camp

- מחנה מסד
- Massad logo, 1963

Location
- Pocono Mountains, Pennsylvania, United States; 41.218°N 74.870°W

Information
- Type: Jewish summer camp
- Founded: July 7, 1941
- Founder: Shlomo Shulsinger
- Closed: 1981; 45 years ago
- Gender: Co-educational
- Language: Hebrew

Camp Massad (Hebrew: מַחֲנֶה מַסָד, Maḥaneh Massad) was a Jewish summer camp in the Pocono Mountains of Pennsylvania, which closed in 1981. Massad's founder, Shlomo Shulsinger, emphasized Hebrew language as a key value in a multi-denominational Zionist Jewish environment.

Massad was founded as a day camp in 1941 by the HaNoar Ha'Ivri with thirty campers, and eventually grew to three sleep-away camps in Pennsylvania, Massad Alef, Bet, and Gimmel, collectively known as the Massad Hebrew Camps in the United States (Hebrew: מַחֲנוֹת מַסָד בְּאַרְצוֹת הַבְּרִית) At its peak in the late 1960s, the Massad camps hosted over a thousand campers and staff each summer. In its forty years of existence, the camp strongly influenced both Jewish camping and Hebrew culture in North America.

== History ==
=== Early years ===
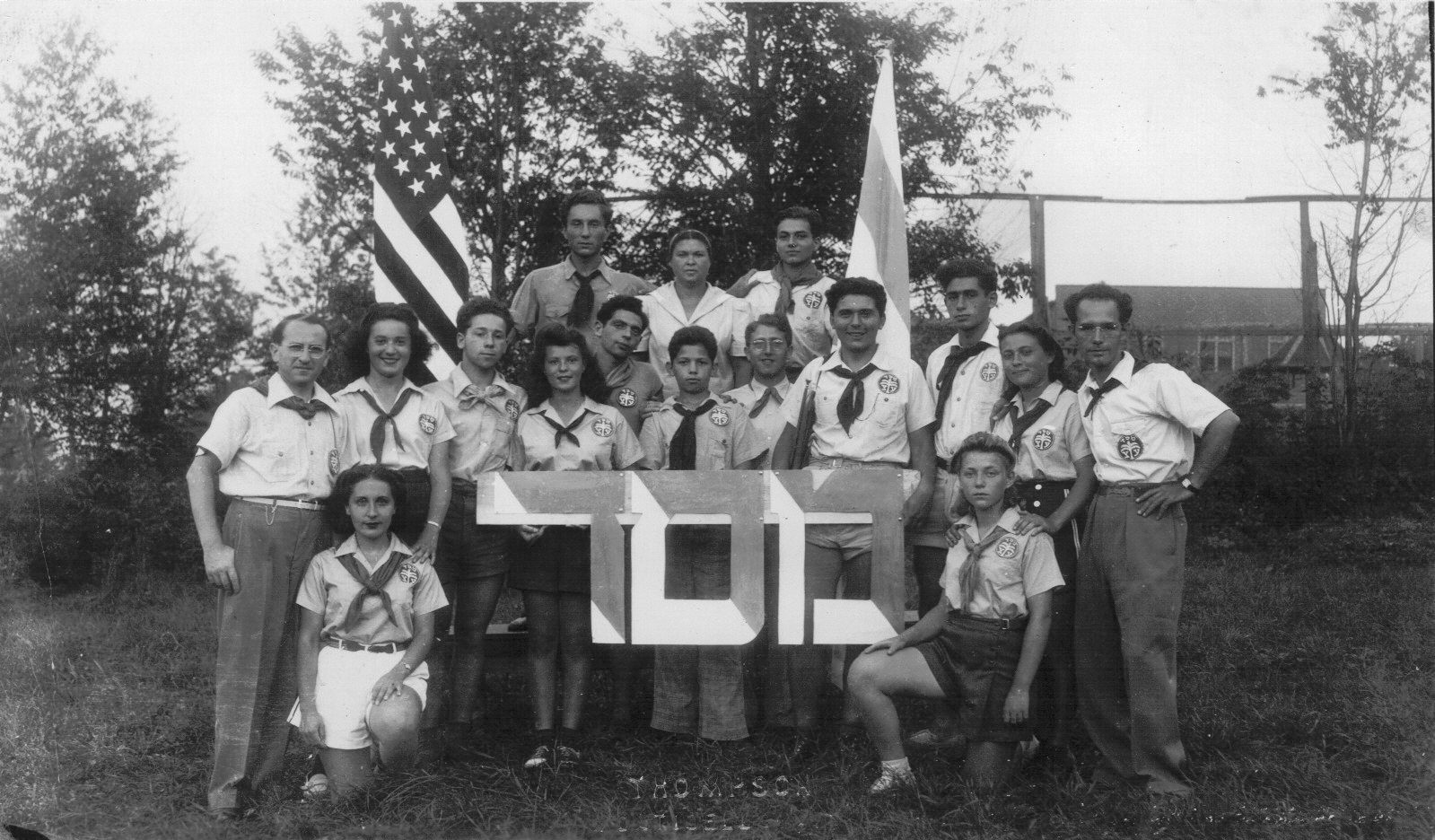
Staff picture (1941)

The HaNoar Ha’Ivri movement (Hebrew: הַהִסְתַדְרוּת הַנֹעַר הַעִבְרִי, lit. 'Union of Hebrew Youth') was established in 1937 to build a Jewish life in the United States that promoted Zionism and the revival of the Hebrew language. In September 1940, the HaNoar Ha'Ivri conference reached a unanimous decision to establish an immersive Hebrew-speaking camp, an idea initiated by Shlomo Shulsinger, who came to the United States from Mandatory Palestine in the 1930s. The camp's name, from the Hebrew word meaning "foundation", was inspired by a line from the poem Birkat Am by Hayim Nahman Bialik.

In its first season in 1941, Massad operated as a day camp at Far Rockaway, Queens with Shulsinger as camp director. While deemed a success, members of HaNoar Ha’Ivri felt that Massad had failed to realize its potential due to interruptions from the campers’ everyday life, with the campers' English- and Yiddish-speaking families and the secular non-Jewish atmosphere of the city diluting the transformative effect of Massad's Hebrew culture. Lacking funds to purchase its own camp, in its second season Massad shared the facilities of Camp Machanaim, an Orthodox Jewish camp in Monticello in the Catskill Mountains, with an enrollment of forty-five campers and ten staff members. In the summer of 1943, Massad finally relocated to its own site in Tannersville, in the Pocono Mountains.

=== Growth and development ===
Massad's enrollment grew steadily during the 1940s as it attracted campers from various Jewish denominations. To meet the growing demand, Massad opened a second camp, Massad Bet, in Dingmans Ferry, Pennsylvania in 1948. Massad Gimmel opened in nearby Effort, Pennsylvania in 1966. In 1951, Massad launched its Machon Ma’ale (Hebrew: מָכוֹן מַעֲלֶה) program for the preparation of Hebrew-speaking counselors, with Professor Hillel Bavli serving as its first director. In 1960, Massad opened up a new division called Prozdor (a preparatory program for the Machon) for 15-year-old campers.

In the 1950s and 1960s, Massad drew the majority of its campers from the Talmud Torahs and day schools in New York, admitting mainly campers with Hebrew educational backgrounds The bulk of the camp populations came from the centrist Orthodox community, especially from the students of the Ramaz School and Flatbush Yeshivot. The Massad camps had their largest camper enrolment in the 1966-68 summers, with 914 campers in 1966, 937 in 1967, and 925 in 1968. Among other prominent visitors to the camp, Chief Rabbi of Israel Shlomo Goren visited Massad Alef in 1974.

=== Decline ===
By the 1970s there was a downward trend. In 1971, for the first time, campers who chose so were accepted for a one-month session. In 1974, facing rapidly declining registration, Massad Gimmel was sold. After the Shulsingers retired in 1977, their successors attempted to orient the camp toward stricter religious observance in effort to address the changing realities of Jewish life in the United States and attract more Orthodox campers. However, Massad's enrollment continued to decline. Massad Bet closed after the 1979 season, and Massad Alef followed suit in 1981. The Massad Alef property was bought by the nearby Camelback Mountain Resort, while the Massad Bet site was used as a camp by the Bobover Hasidic community until 1996.

A number of explanations have been given for the decline of the Massad movement, such as the rise and expansion of denominational camps like the Conservative-sponsored Camp Ramah, the Shulsingers' retirement, the availability of summer programs in Israel, the growing weakness of the American centrist Orthodox community, the suburbanization of American Jewry, and a waning birth rate. Moreover, Massad lost much of its camper base as it became increasingly perceived as both not traditional enough for Orthodox Jews, and too traditional for the growing number of secular, Reform, and Conservative Jews.

The related Canadian Massad movement created three camps in Canada, Massad Alef at Lac Quenouille, Quebec, Massad Bet in Torrance, Ontario, and Massad Gimmel in Winnipeg Beach, Manitoba. The Quebec and Manitoba camps are still in operation. Camp Massad of Manitoba is now the only Hebrew-immersion camp outside of Israel.

== Culture ==
The Massad movement sought to create a rich and authentic Hebrew Jewish life in the United States, and promote national renewal in Israel. While there were no formal classes, there was a carefully crafted educational program at the center of every aspect of the camp. Campers learned about Jewish traditions, the Hebrew language, culture, Zionism, and current events through their everyday activities. Starting in 1966, Massad had a delegation of 25-30 Israeli counselors each year (selected by the Jewish Agency in Jerusalem), who participated in all areas of camping. The streets of the camp and its buildings were named after Theodor Herzl, Hannah Szenes, Henrietta Szold, Hayim Nahman Bialik and other Zionist heroes.

Shulsinger demanded that Hebrew alone be spoken at all times in the camp and gave awards to campers who achieved this goal. Given the camp's goal of an immersive Hebrew-language environment, Massad became the locus for a large amount of new Hebrew vocabulary, to describe American sports for instance. Massad's focus on spoken and written Hebrew extended to publishing a literary periodical, Alim (lit. 'Leaves'), which included guest pieces by such distinguished writers as William Chomsky, and a Hebrew-English dictionary that included more than 3,000 entries.

One of the biggest activities of the summer, the Maccabia color war, divided the camp into two teams with opposing themes, which competed in various activities including songs, skits, sports, and pageants. In addition to the traditional and religious aspects of the camp, which included daily morning prayers and Shabbat observance, Camp Massad also aimed to inspire the love of living as a halutz in Israel through agricultural projects.

== Legacy ==
Massad's influence on other major Jewish camps was significant. The founder of Camp Ramah attended, and Camps Morasha, Moshava, and Yavneh modeled themselves after Massad.

The three volumes of Kovetz Massad document Camp Massad's culture and history. The first volume, published in New York in 1978, focused on Massad summer camps in the United States. The second volume, published in Jerusalem in 1989, was dedicated to Hebrew camping in North America, including a historical survey of several Hebrew camps and sociological data on the integration of Massad alumni into Israeli society. The third volume, published in Jerusalem in 1991, is a pictorial history of Camp Massad's forty years.

== Notable staff and alumni ==
- David Berger (1943– ), professor of Jewish studies
- David Bernstein, dean of the Pardes Institute
- Balfour Brickner (1926–2005), rabbi and political activist
- Ephraim Buchwald, Jewish educator
- T. Carmi (1925–1994), poet
- Noam Chomsky (1928– ), linguist
- Moshe Davis (1916–1996), historian
- Alan Dershowitz (1938– ), lawyer and academic
- Sylvia Ettenberg (1917–2012), Jewish educator
- Menahem Golan (1929–2014), film producer
- Blu Greenberg (1936– ), writer
- Hillel Halkin (1939– ), translator and novelist
- Ehud Havazelet (1955–2015), novelist
- Ephraim Kanarfogel (1955– ), historian
- Dave Kufeld (1958– ), basketball player
- Aaron Landes (1929–2014), rabbi
- Ralph Lauren (1939– ), fashion designer and business executive
- Jay Lefkowitz (1962– ), human rights advocate
- Deborah Lipstadt (1947– ), historian
- Haskel Lookstein (1932– ), rabbi
- Michael Mukasey (1942– ), 81st Attorney General of the United States
- Shlomo Riskin (1940– ), rabbi
- Noam Pitlik (1932–1999), television director and actor
- Dennis Prager (1948– ), talk show host and writer
- Joseph Telushkin (1948– ), writer

== See also ==
- Camp Achvah
- Camp Massad (Manitoba)
- Camp Massad (Montreal)
