= Massad family =

Arab Christian family name

The Massad family (Arabic: مَسعد, /ˈmæsˈæd/; also written Massaad or Mas'ad), is an Arab Eastern Orthodox Christian and Maronite family name. Originally from Jdeideh Marjayoun, Lebanon, the family emigrated to South America and to the United States (especially to Oklahoma) during the late 19th and early 20th centuries due to the rising oppression of Christians in the Muslim Turkish Ottoman Empire.

== Notable people ==
- Paul Peter Massad (1806–1890), Maronite Christian Patriarch of Antioch
- Timothy Massad (b. 1956), Lawyer and US Treasury Department official

== See also ==
- Antiochian Greek Christians
- Arab Christians
- Christianity in Lebanon
- Greek genocide
- Greek Orthodox (Roum Orthodox) Christians in Lebanon
- History of Arab Christians
- History of Eastern Christianity
- History of the Eastern Orthodox Church under the Ottoman Empire
- Lebanese Americans
- Persecution of Eastern Orthodox Christians
