= Tell Me That You Love Me (film) =

- Directed by: Tzipi Trope
- Written by: Sandra Kolber; Tzipi Trope
- Produced by: Jim Kaufman; Yisrael Ringel
- Starring: Nick Mancuso; Barbara Williams; Andrée Pelletier; Kenneth Welsh
- Cinematography: David Gurfinkel
- Edited by: Yves Langlois
- Music by: André Gagnon
- Production companies: Astral Bellevue Pathé; Moviestore Entertainment; Roll Film Productions
- Release date: 1983
- Running time: 91 minutes
- Countries: Canada; Israel
- Language: English

Tell Me That You Love Me is a 1983 drama film directed by Tzipi Trope. The film stars Nick Mancuso and Barbara Williams as Dan and Miri, a couple in Tel Aviv whose marriage is running into trouble; meanwhile Miri, a journalist, begins to write a story about spousal abuse when she meets Naomi (Andrée Pelletier), a woman who is being abused by her husband David (Kenneth Welsh). It is a co-production of Canada and Israel.

The film was poorly received by critics. Gerald Pratley called it "a protracted, poorly written and unreal story of a failed marriage", while Greg Quill of the Toronto Star wrote that "The only relief from all this dreary anguish is temporary separation. Dan takes a job for a year in New York, Miri works out The Meaning Of Life at home. By then, of course, we couldn't care less about their relationship, about the long, sad silences these two greedy, self-centred people share at the nadir of their married life. Let's just hope they get their just desserts: another 50 years together."

Welsh received a Genie Award nomination for Best Supporting Actor at the 5th Genie Awards in 1984.
