= Linda Rabin =

Canadian dancer, choreographer and educator

Linda Rabin CM (born September 28, 1946) is a Canadian dancer, choreographer and educator. The daughter of Max Rabin, a clothing salesman, and Mina Rosen, a Polish immigrant, she was born in Montreal. Rabin studied modern dance with José Limón, with Anna Sokolow, at the Juilliard School where she received a Bachelor of Fine Arts and at the Martha Graham School. She also studied Asian dance forms and Asian dance theatre in Japan, Bali, India and Nepal. She has studied Body/Mind Centering, Alexander Technique, shiatsu, Pilates and ideokinesis.

From 1968 to 1973, she performed, taught and developed choreography in Israel, mainly with the Lia Schubert Company in Haifa. From 1973 to 1974, she was rehearsal director with Ballet Rambert in London. Since 1974, she has been based in Canada.

Her works have been performed by various Canadian dance companies including Les Grands Ballets Canadiens, as well as international companies including the Batsheva Dance Company and the Nederlands Dans Theater 2.

Rabin has taught at Simon Fraser University, the Université du Québec à Montréal, and York University. She has held workshops in Canada, Japan, England, France, Austria and Guatemala. She also was co-founder of Ateliers de Danse Moderne de Montreal, later the École de danse contemporaine de Montréal .

In 2019, she was named to the Order of Canada as a Member.
