= Camp Massad (Manitoba) =

Canadian summer camp

Camp Massad of Manitoba מחנה מסד

Location
- Winnipeg Beach, Manitoba, R0C 3G0
- Coordinates: 50.52627°N 96.9766°W

Information
- Former name: Massad Gimmel
- Type: Jewish summer camp
- Established: 1953; 72 years ago
- Grades: 2–10
- Language: Hebrew
- Affiliation: MCA
- Website: campmassad.ca

Camp Massad of Manitoba (Hebrew: מַחֲנֶה מַסָד, translit. Maḥaneh Massad) is a Jewish summer camp located north of Winnipeg Beach, Manitoba, in the Interlake Region near Winnipeg. It is the only Hebrew immersion camp in Western Canada.

The camp attracts campers from Winnipeg, other parts of Canada and various cities in the United States. Camp Massad is a registered charity and an accredited member of the Manitoba Camping Association.

== History ==
The camp was founded in 1953 by members of Habonim under the leadership of Soody Kleiman, supported by the Keren Hatarbut. Eddie Yuditsky, principal of the Winnipeg Hebrew School, served as Massad's first director and Leona Billinkoff as the first 'camp mother' (a position she would keep until 1978). The camp was officially incorporated as a branch of the Hebrew Camps Massad of Canada, Massad Gimmel, in 1962.

The Hebrew Congregation of Winnipeg Beach synagogue, founded in 1950, moved to the site of Camp Massad in 1998.

== Notable alumni ==
- Jonas Chernick (born 1973), actor
- Gad Horowitz (born 1936), political scientist
- Allan Levine (born 1956), author
- Allan Novak, television director

== See also ==
- Camp Massad (Montreal)
