= Peggy Baker =

Canadian dancer, choreographer and teacher (born 1952)

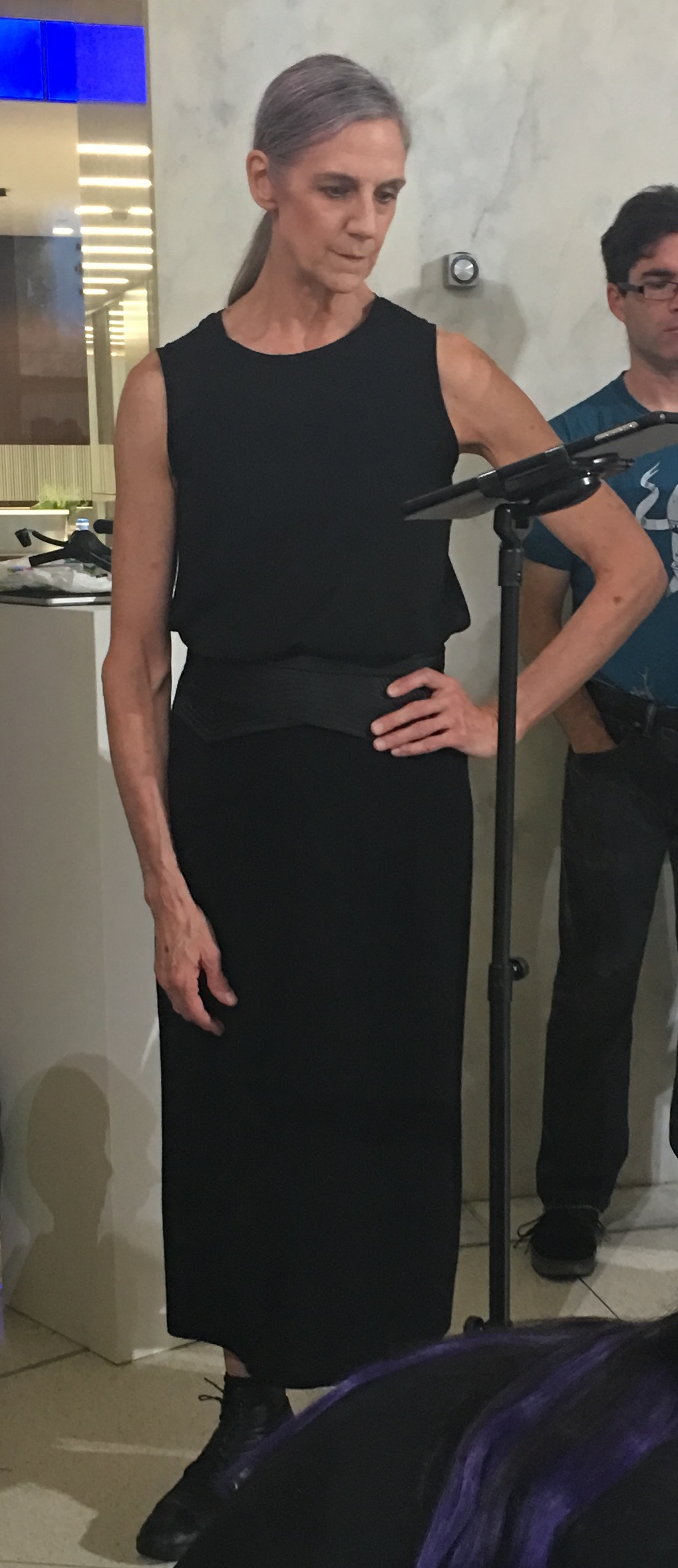
- Peggy Baker at Nuit Blanche 2016 in Toronto
- Born: Peggy Laurayne Smith; October 22, 1952 (age 74); Edmonton, Alberta, Canada
- Known for: Dancer; Choreographer
- Movement: Modern/Contemporary dance

Peggy Laurayne Baker (née Smith; born October 22, 1952) is a Canadian modern dancer, choreographer and teacher. She has been awarded the Order of Canada and she was the first person to receive the Ontario Premier’s Award for Excellence in the Arts.

== Life ==
Baker was born in Edmonton, Alberta, Canada. She was the second child of six. She has lived in Canada and the United States.

== Education and early work ==
Baker first studied acting at the University of Alberta. While there Baker was introduced to Modern Dance by Patricia Beatty, one of the founders of the Toronto Dance Theatre. In 1971 she moved to Toronto to study with Beatty at the School of Toronto Dance Theatre. After graduating from the school she appeared with the company as a dancer. In 1974 she co-founded the Dancemakers Dance Company. In 1980 she moved to New York City to dance with the Lar Lubovitch Dance Company. In 1990 she joined Mikhail Baryshnikov's dance company White Oak Dance Project which re-launched her career as a dancer and choreographer. She performed her first solo concert in 1990 called Le Charme d l'Impossible. It was commissioned by the Canada Dance Festival and premiered at the Winnipeg Dance Festival.

In 1993 she was invited to be the National Ballet School of Canada's first artist-in-residence.

She founded the Peggy Baker Dance Projects to develop solo dance expression. In 1993 she was hired as the National Ballet of Canada's first artist-in-residence to teach, choreograph and stage Lar Lubovitch's work.

== Personal life ==
Baker married her first husband Michael J. Baker in Edmonton before she moved to Toronto.

Baker met her future husband Ahmed Hassan in the 1970s when he composed for some of Baker’s work. They married in 1990 and remained married until his death in 2011 of multiple sclerosis.

== Awards ==
In 2006 Baker was awarded the Order of Canada and in 2007 she was the first person to receive the Ontario Premier’s Award for Excellence in the Arts.

In 2010 the Canada Council for the Arts presented Baker with the Walter Carsen Prize.
