= White Rabbit (disambiguation) =

The White Rabbit is a character in Alice's Adventures in Wonderland.

White Rabbit or White Rabbits may also refer to:

== Art ==
- White Rabbit Gallery, Chinese contemporary art museum in Sydney, Australia
- White Rabbits (sculptors), a group of women sculptors who worked with Lorado Taft at the World's Columbian Exposition in 1893

== Print ==
- The White Rabbit (book), by Bruce Marshall, about F. F. E. Yeo-Thomas
- White Rabbit (Marvel Comics), a Spider-Man villain
- White Rabbit (DC Comics), alias of Jaina "Jai" Hudson, a DC Batman character

== Film and television ==
- "White Rabbit", an episode of Law & Order
- White Rabbit (2013 film), an American drama film about a bullied teen
- White Rabbit (2018 film), an American comedy-drama film
- "White Rabbit" (Lost), a 2004 episode of the television show Lost
- The White Rabbit (TV series), a 1967 British TV series based on the book by Bruce Marshall
- White Rabbit (Devil May Cry) a character from the Devil May Cry Netflix series

== Music ==
- "White Rabbit", a song by Trixie Mattel and Michelle Branch from the Blonde & Pink Albums, 2022
- The White Rabbit, a 1963 album and song by Peter Posa
- White Rabbit (Egypt Central album), 2011, or its title track
- White Rabbit (George Benson album), 1972
- "White Rabbit" (song), a 1967 song by Jefferson Airplane
- White Rabbits (band), an American indie band

== Science and technology ==
- 17942 Whiterabbit, asteroid discovered in 1999 by Y. Shimizu and T. Urata
- White Rabbit No. 6, a codename for a military trench digging machine
- White Rabbit Project at CERN, a network time protocol

== Other uses ==
- F. F. E. Yeo-Thomas (1902–1964), British Second World War secret agent called "The White Rabbit" by the Germans
- White Rabbit, an imprint of Orion Publishing Group
- The White Rabbit, pseudonym used by conspiracy theorist Nicola Charles
- White Rabbit (candy), a Chinese confection
- "White rabbits", a variation of the superstitious phrase "Rabbit rabbit rabbit", said on the first of the month
- Operation White Rabbit, a U.S. Drug Enforcement Agency investigation in 2000 that led to the arrest of William Leonard Pickard
- White Rabbit Books & Things, LGBTQ bookstore in the United States
- White Rabbit Radio, a white nationalist online radio station

== See also ==
- List of rabbit breeds
- Rabbit (disambiguation)
- White Rabbit Project (TV series), an investigative series starring the co-hosts of MythBusters
- White Rabbit Red Rabbit, a 2010 play by Nassim Soleimanpour
