= Angry Goy II =

2018 video game

- Developer: Wheel Maker Studios
- Publisher: Christopher Cantwell (RadicalAgenda)
- Platform: Windows
- Release: November 11, 2018; 7 years ago
- Genre: Shoot 'em up

Angry Goy II is a freeware shoot 'em up created by Wheel Maker Studios. It was published via Christopher Cantwell's website, RadicalAgenda, on November 11, 2018.

== Gameplay ==
Angry Goy II starts with a title screen featuring one of many characters in game, including PewDiePie. There are multiple playable characters, including Richard B. Spencer, Christopher Cantwell, Mac Tonight, "The Golden One", Adolf Hitler, TayAI, "Murdoch", Luca Traini, Steven Crowder, "Der Soldat", Jesus Christ, George Lincoln Rockwell, and other unlockable characters (21 in total). The main goal of Angry Goy II is to kill minorities, LGBTQ people, Communists, Antifa members, members of the American left-wing, and Jewish people in order to save US President Donald Trump from in-game liberals who kidnapped him.

There are several levels in Angry Goy II, including "Communist Headquarters"; the "Fake News Network"; and "LGBT+ Agenda HQ". In the level "Fake News Network", the player has to shoot and kill journalists in the offices of the "Fake News Network". The level "LGBT+ Agenda HQ" is set in an LGBTQ nightclub with a sign that says "Children Welcome", a reference to a conspiracy theory that gay people are pedophiles. In this level, the player's objective is to kill as many gay people as possible. The level resembles the 2016 Pulse nightclub shooting committed by Omar Mateen. The gays are marked with a large erect penis in the game.

If the player dies, they are met with a screen that states they failed to "save the west" and shown one of several "game over" sequences, including the 2017 torture of a developmentally disabled white teen by several black assailants, a woman identified as a 'Jewess' claiming that "Europe has not yet learned to be multicultural", or a small, transgender child talking about how they are 'normal, just like everybody else.'.

== History ==
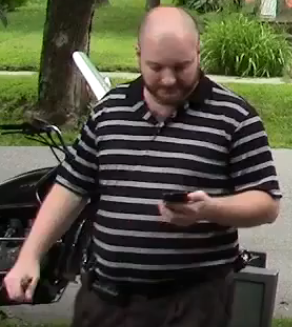
Publisher Christopher Cantwell

Angry Goy II was released as a prequel to the Angry Goy game, released in 2017. On his website, RadicalAgenda, Christopher Cantwell wrote "Angry Goy II is the season's hit game for White males who have had it with Jewish bullshit," and "Instead of taking out your frustrations on actual human beings, you can fight the mongrels and degenerates on your computer! Use guns, knives, pepper spray, and more! Lay waste to wave after wave of shitdicks, shitskins, shitstains, and the kikes they serve." Prior to its release, a trailer for the game was released on YouTube, later being taken down by the platform for violating its hate speech guidelines. Cantwell also promoted the game on the alt-tech platform Gab.

== See also ==
- Ethnic Cleansing
