= David (inspired by Michelangelo) =

Coordinates: 38°15′25.6″N 85°45′42.1″W

Ozkaya's David (inspired by Michelangelo) minutes before the collapse. 2005

David (inspired by Michelangelo) is a sculpture by Turkish conceptual artist Serkan Özkaya. It is a reproduction of Michelangelo's David made of gold-painted foam, twice the size of the original, and based on a computer model by Stanford University professor Marc Levoy. It was originally created for the 9th International Istanbul Biennial in 2005, and took six people six months to build, but it collapsed during installation.

The statue was restored and two copies were cast at a workshop in the Turkish city of Eskişehir. One of them will be displayed at a park in Eskişehir. The other was acquired by the 21c Museum Hotel in Louisville, Kentucky, and was transported, lying on its side on a truck trailer, into New York City in March 2011 for a presentation at the Storefront for Art and Architecture before continuing on to its permanent location in Louisville.

The sculpture is a subject of a 2010 film by Danila Cahen, Friendly Enemies, and of a 2011 book, Rise and Fall and Rise of David (inspired by Michelangelo).
