= Serkan Özkaya =

Turkish and American conceptual artist (born 1973)

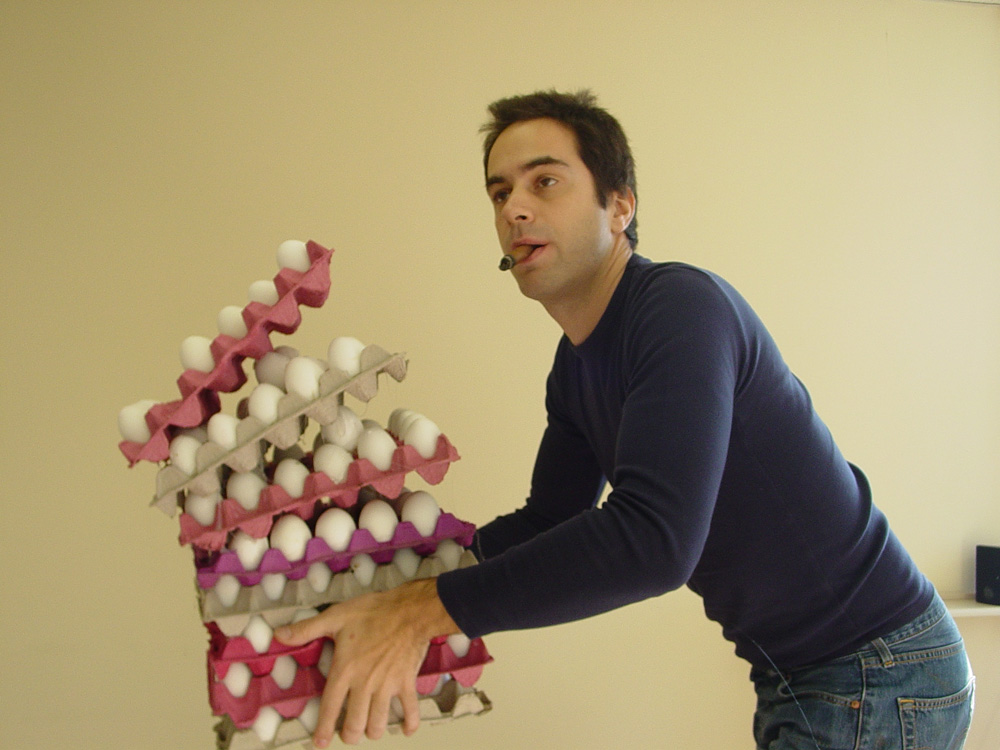
- Özkaya as Baker's Apprentice in a self-portrait from 2006
- Born: 1973 (age 52–53); Turkey
- Education: Bard College, Istanbul University
- Known for: Contemporary art, Conceptual art
- Notable work: David (inspired by Michelangelo)
- Awards: MacDowell Colony, Society of Newspaper Design, Civitella Ranieri

Serkan Özkaya (born 1973) is a Turkish and American conceptual artist whose work deals with topics of appropriation and reproduction.

He operates outside of traditional art spaces and makes multiple versions of even his own work, including his most noted work David (inspired by Michelangelo). Özkaya's artworks are held in the permanent collections of the İstanbul Modern, Borusan Contemporary Art, and Arter in Istanbul, as well as 21c Museum Hotels locations (Louisville, Kentucky, Bentonville, Arkansas, and Nashville, Tennessee).

== Early life and education ==
Özkaya grew up in Istanbul, Turkey. At a young age, he began learning about Western art through the study of reproductions of major artworks found in books. It is here his interests in the concepts originality, replication and emulation began. He attended Istanbul University, graduating with both a bachelor and a master's degree in arts. He continued his graduate studies at Bard College. After leaving Bard with a master's degree in fine art, he received an art fellowship at MacDowell Colony. Özkaya then returned to Istanbul University to study for his Ph.D. in German Language and Literature. In 2001, he published Genius and Creativity in the Arts, a comparative study of the German works Moses und Aron (an opera by Arnold Schoenberg), Doctor Faustus (a novel by Thomas Mann) and Die Philosophie der Neuen Musik (a book by Theodor W. Adorno).

== Career ==
=== Notable works in serial form ===
Dear Sir or Madam (1996–2009) is a collection of letters and other correspondences between Özkaya and cultural institutions, dignitaries and curators. It is his own paper trail of bureaucracy in inaction. In the collection, among others, are his letters to the Louvre asking that he be allowed to hang the Mona Lisa upside down, and a letter to the German Bundestag that they permit him to re-wrap the Reichstag. Often, the letters do not deserve a response but curiously, they have usually been treated with official but unthinking courtesy, read perhaps but not comprehended—answered and then often passed along the bureaucratic chain. In 2009, Dear Sir or Madam was exhibited at the Slag Gallery in New York along with works from the same period. Among them was Proletarier Aller Laender (1998-2009) or Proletariat of all Countries, as it is also known in English, a collection of red plastic foam figurines glued to the floor. In viewing this work, the audience is most likely forced to trample on the little figures as if to trample on the working classes. However, the proletariat, which the figurines represent, in "their resilience and ultimate power always springing back, indestructible". Other works in the exhibition included the golden sculptures Levitation by Defecation (2008), Shit on a Stick (2008), and Goldenboy (2006), "a fiberglass figure painted in gold acrylic and dangling a couple of feet off the ground by a noose".

In 2000, Özkaya collected roughly 30,000 slides from artists, galleries, and institutions and showed them on one of the largest galleries in the main pedestrian street in Istanbul, at the Kazim Taskent Art Gallery. What A Museum Should Really Look Like (Large Glass) presented a giant mosaic of individual images. During the day, the slides were readable from the inside of the gallery and at night, with the lights on, they became a scene for the street. This piece was later initiated in Utrecht, the Netherlands in a much larger scale with 100,000 slides. The collage of thousands of pieces of artwork was collected through an online advertisement. All of the works were arranged in the mosaic with no coherent order and no editorial or curatorial control from Özkaya.

In 2003, Özkaya turned the front and back covers of the Turkish language newspaper, Radikal into drawings. This act enabled the reader to acquire a limited edition artwork for the price of the newspaper. In early 2004, it was part of a group exhibition named "The Poetics of Proximity" at the Guggenheim Gallery at Chapman University. In similar fashion, in subsequent years, some pages of several other newspapers were also hand-rendered and appeared as a print of the drawings. The overall piece, entitled Today Could Be A Day Of Historical Importance was executed in Sweden with Aftonbladet, in Germany with Freitag, and in the US with The New York Times and The Courier-Journal. The last of which was created in collaboration with the non-profit artwithoutwalls. The New York Times version in the "Weekend Arts" section appeared mise en abyme with Özkaya's drawing appearing as an inset in the page and an even smaller drawing appearing as an inset of that, and so on, creating a Droste effect.

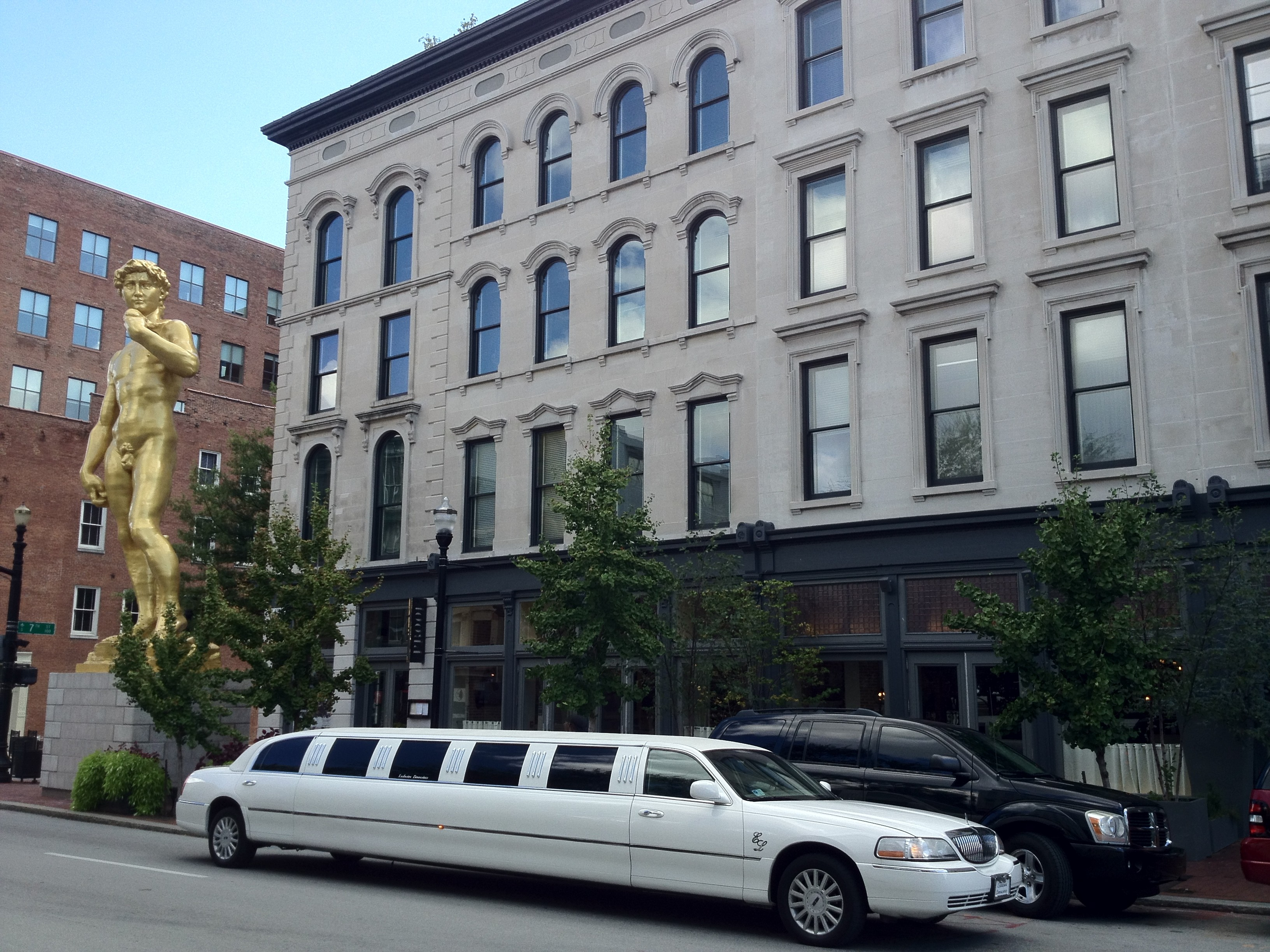
David (inspired by Michelangelo) in front of 21c Museum Hotel

In 2005, Özkaya created David (inspired by Michelangelo), a double-sized golden replica of Michelangeloʼs David based on a 3D computer model by Marc Levoy of Stanford University. The sculpture was first intended to be part of the 9th International Istanbul Biennial. Unfortunately, the statue crashed and was destroyed while in the process of being installed at Şişli Square. Özkaya created two new versions of the replica at a studio in Eskişehir, one of which was to be placed in the local Sazova Science, Art and Culture Park. The other was acquired by 21c Museum Hotels in Louisville, Kentucky. On its way to Louisville, the piece made a stop in New York City. Although just a mere copy, the statue made quite a spectacle, as the artist intended, attracting the attention of tourists and residents as it was transported uncovered lying horizontally on a semi-trailer truck. The giant 30-foot statue is currently featured in front of the museum hotel on West Main Street in Louisville.

In A Sudden Gust of Wind (2007 –2013), Özkaya depicted the journey of a stack of papers blown away by the wind. The original work was made with basic materials: standard A4 paper, thread, and glue. The piece was inspired by Ejiri in Suruga Province (A Sudden Gust of Wind), a 19th-century Japanese woodcut by Hokusai, and A Sudden Gust of Wind (after Hokusai) (1993) by Jeff Wall. One version of the installation was first exhibited at the Boots Contemporary Art Space in St. Louis, Missouri. Another version of the work was acquired by 21c Museum Hotel and installed at their third location in Bentonville, Arkansas. This version utilizes about 400 metal sheets scattered in a large gallery space.

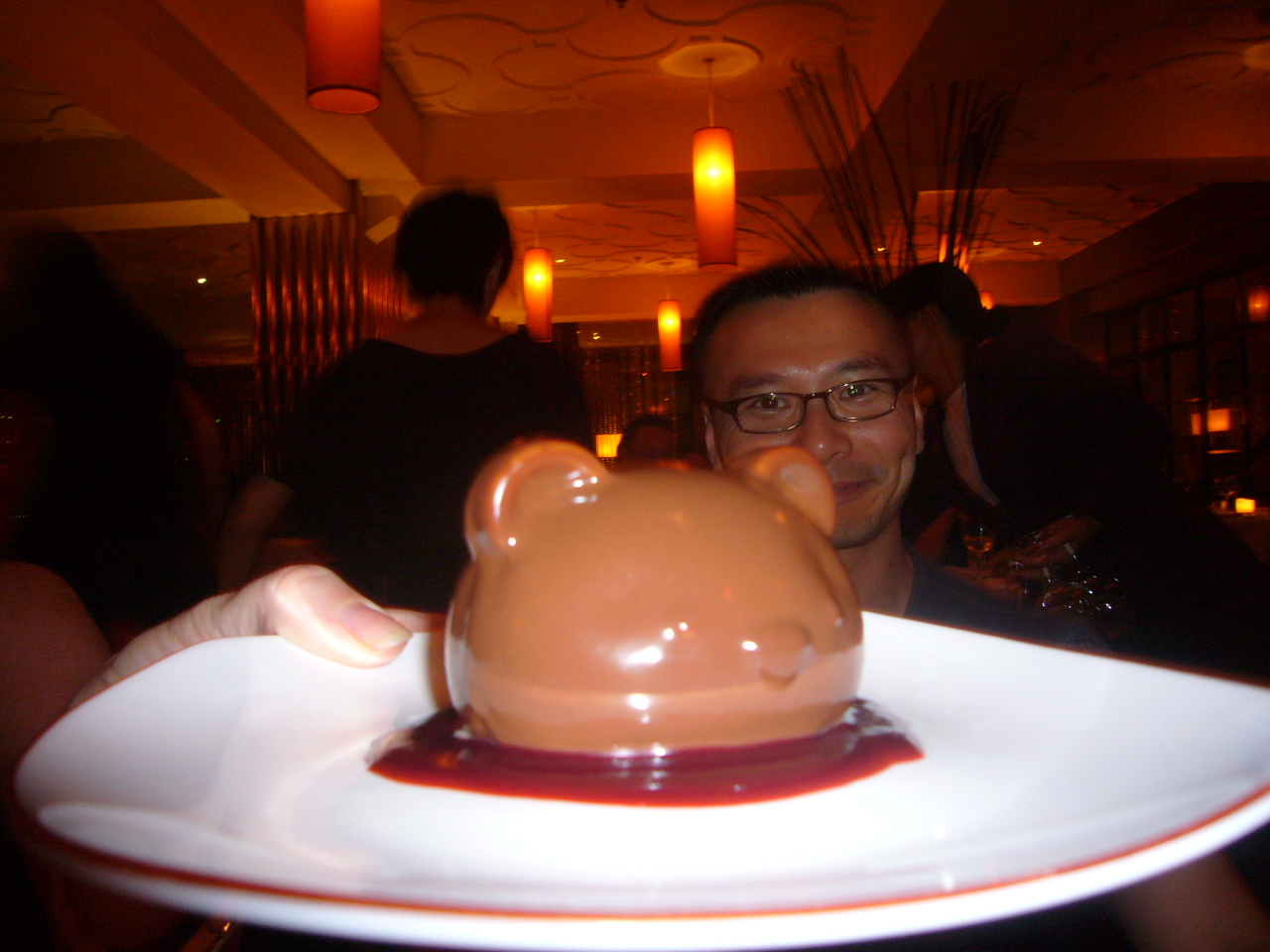
Bring me the head of... at Freemans' Restaurant as part of Performa07

Bring me the head of… (2007–2015) is the edible form of a teddy bear's head on a plate. Instead of working with museums or galleries, in this series, Özkaya collaborated with restaurants and chefs and they decided the ingredients—that is the material of the sculpture. This work was made in collaboration with M on the Bund in Shanghai, offered at Freemans' Restaurant in New York in 2007 as a part of the Performa Biennial, at Changa in Istanbul in 2008, as street food in İzmir in 2009, at Capital M in Beijing in 2012, and at the Hive in Bentonville, Arkansas in 2014.

In One and Three Pasta (2012), Özkaya collaborated with the architect George L. Legendre, a professor at Harvard University. Using Legendreʼs mathematical equations (published in Pasta By Design and reviewed in the New Scientist), they created a series of computer-generated replicas of 92 types of pasta and 3D-printed them in nylon. The actual pieces of pasta were displayed next to their ideal nylon replicas, along with the generative equations of each shape. One and Three Pasta references to canonical works like Joseph Kosuthʼs One and Three Chairs and Donald Juddʼs Untitled stacks.

An Attempt at Exhausting A Place… is a series of works in which the artist "dissolves the white cube" and the usual constraints of a traditional art space. Four projectors are used to display a live feed of the scene beyond the wall on which they are projected. The work was exhibited as part of Özkaya's solo exhibition at the Postmasters Gallery in New York, running from May 14 to June 18, 2016. In a similar installation at İstanbul Modern, a projection on one its interior walls treated the view to a scene of the Bosphorus Strait, making the wall seem transparent. A version of the work is also presented in a permanent exhibition at the lobby of the 21c Museum Hotel in Nashville, Tennessee.

=== Other notable works ===
Atlas (2011) is a contribution to a walking museum wherein Özkaya constructed a rock to be strapped to the curator's back and promenaded daily throughout the streets of New York. The idea was to make "the museum" itself wander around the streets of the city with Özkaya's new piece, a giant rock.

Radisson/Picasso (2012), a pair of Radisson Hotel matchboxes with the text of one of which has been changed to read "Picasso" instead of "Radisson" and was displayed alongside the original.

Mirage (2013) was installed at the Postmasters Gallery in New York and consisted of a shadow of a passenger airplane that crossed the room for 45 seconds every four minutes. The shadow here was considered not as the mere absence of light, but rather as a material in and of itself which could then be sculpted. The work was also exhibited as part of the Borusan Contemporary Art Collection's Overture: New Acquisitions (2015) at Perili Köşk in Istanbul.

MyMoon (2015 – present) is another artwork by Özkaya, a large round rock floating in the sky, that is visible only through a smartphone via the MyMoon app. Using the phone's GPS and compass, MyMoon app detects the object in the sky and makes it visible. MyMoon rotates in close proximity to the earth's moon in the sky. Yet unlike the earth's satellite, it is visible outdoors and indoors.

In October 2017, Özkaya presented his latest major work En attendons (We Will Wait) at the Postmasters Gallery. The work is a recreation of Marcel Duchamp's Étant donnés from which Özkaya's also gets its name in anagram form. Özkaya claims to have discovered a secret hidden within Duchamp's piece. He proposes that it is not only a peephole into a diorama but that, under proper lighting, it also functions as a camera obscura that projects the French artist's self-portrait on a surface opposite the peephole. According to Özkaya, there is more to Étant Donnés than previously thought; that the work, which took Duchamp more than 20 years to create, projects an image of Rrose Sélavy, "Duchamp’s female alter ego."

== Exhibitions ==
=== Selected solo exhibitions ===
- Lives and Works in Utrecht (2002), BeganeGrond, Utrecht, The Netherlands
- Minerva Street (2003), Galerist, Istanbul, Turkey
- Monet: A Retrospective (2006), Künstlerhaus Bethanien, Berlin, Germany
- When He Came Back to His Senses, The Monster Was Still Waiting in Front of the Cave (2006), Galerist, Istanbul, Turkey
- Bring Me the Head Of… (2007), M on the Bund, Shanghai, China
- A Sudden Gust of Wind (2008), Boots Contemporary Art Space, St. Louis, Missouri
- Dear Sir or Madam (2009), Slag Gallery New York City, NY, (2009)
- Today Could Be a Day of Historical Importance (2010), Slag Gallery, New York City, New York
- Homo Practicus (2010), Geleri Nev, Istanbul, Turkey
- ATLAS (2011), New York City
- David (inspired by Michelangelo) (2012), 21c Museum Hotel, Louisville, Kentucky
- One and Three Pasta (with George L. Legendre) (2012), Galerist, Istanbul, Turkey
- Mirage (2013), Postmasters Gallery, New York City
- Today Was Really Yesterday (2014), Galerist, Istanbul, Turkey
- Sudden Gusts of the World (2014), curated by Marta Smolinska, Galeria Miejska Arsenal, Poznan, Poland
- One and Three Pasta with George L. Legendre (2014), Postmasters Gallery, New York City
- An Attempt at Exhausting a Place in New York (2016), Postmasters Gallery, New York City
- We Will Wait (2017), Postmasters Gallery, New York City

=== Selected group exhibitions ===
- Side-Effects (2004), curated by WHW group: Natasha Ilic, Sabina Sabolovic and Ana Devic, WHW Gallery, Zagreb Croatia,
- public.exe (2004), curated by Anne Ellegood, Michele Thurz, Exit Art, New York City, NY,
- Situated Self City (2005), curated by Mika Hannula, and Branco Dimitrijevic, Museum Helsinki, Helsinki, Finland
- 9th International Istanbul Biennial (2005), curated by Vasif Kortun, Charles Esche, Istanbul, Turkey,
- 7th Biennial of Video and New Media (2005), Santiago de Chile, Chile
- SHIFTscale – Extended Field of Contemporary Sculpture (2006), curated by Mika Hannula, Hanno Soans and Villu Jaanisoo, Kumu Art Museum, Tallinn, Estonia
- Pre Emptive (2006), curated by Philippe Pirotte, Kunsthalle Bern, Bern, Switzerland
- Modern and Beyond (2007), curated by Fulya Erdemci, Santral Istanbul, Istanbul, Turkey
- PERFORMA07 (2007), curated by Roselee Goldberg with Defne Ayas, New York City
- A Series of Coincidences (2009), curated by Regine Basha, Cabinet, New York City
- Ohne Hintersinn (2009), curated by Benjamin Fellmann, Istanbul, Turkey
- Drawn From Photography (2011), curated by Claire Gilman, The Drawing Center, New York City
- Carnal Knowledge: Sex + Philosophy (2012), curated by Christopher Eamon and Beth Stryker, Leslie Tonkonow Gallery, New York City
- Certainty and Vision (2013), curated by Peter Lang and Moritz Gotze, Frankesche Stiftungen zu Halle, Saale, Germany
- ZEITRAUM (2015), curated by Marta Smolińska, Zamek Cultural Center, Poznań, Poland
- The Museum Imagined (2015), curated by Lilly Wei, Danese/Corey Gallery, New York City
- this one is smaller than this one (2016), curated by Paulina Bebecka, Postmasters Gallery, New York City
- Truth or Dare: A Reality Show (2017), curated by Alice Gray Stites, 21c Museum Hotel in Nashville, Tennessee

== Selected publications ==
- Özkaya, Serkan (2000). Sanatta deha ve yaratıcılık : Schönberg, Adorno, Thomas Mann [Genius and Creativity in the Arts: Schönberg, Adorno, Thomas Mann]. Istanbul: Pan. ISBN 9758434152. OCLC 283639082.
- Özkaya, Serkan (2004). Göründüĝ ̈gibi deĝil! Açıklayabilirim [It’s Not What It Looks Like! I Can Explain]. Istanbul: Baĝlam. ISBN 9758803158.
- Esche, Charles (2005). Özkaya, Serkan (ed.). Modest proposals. Ankara: Baǧlam Publishing. ISBN 9758803417. OCLC 778073932.
- Sharp, Willoughby; Özkaya, Serkan (2007). Have you ever done anything right?: Willoughby Sharp interviews Serkan Özkaya. White Wine Press. ISBN 9788493423643. OCLC 936770899.
- Özkaya, Serkan (2010). Today could be a day of historical importance. artwithoutwalls. ISBN 9780615346601. OCLC 868679500.
- Özkaya, Serkan (2011). The rise and fall and rise of David: inspired by Michelangelo. Istanbul: Yapi & Kredi and 21c Museum Hotel (Louisville, Ky. ISBN 9789750820908. OCLC 820727229.
- Özkaya, Serkan, ed. (2013). Double. Lars Müller. ISBN 9783037783450.
- Özkaya, Serkan; Fitterman, Robert, eds. (Fall 2017). "Public Attendant A TO Z". Public. 56.
