= Savoy Grill =

Savoy Grill may refer to:

- Savoy Hotel Grill Room, commonly known as the Grill Room restaurant, located in the Savoy Hotel in London
- Savoy Hotel and Grill, the oldest restaurant in Kansas City, Missouri, opened in 1903
