= Judy Fox =

American sculptor

- Born: 1957 (age 68–69); Elizabeth, New Jersey, U.S.
- Education: Skowhegan School of Painting and Sculpture; Yale University; New York University
- Known for: Sculpture, installation
- Awards: Guggenheim Fellowship; Anonymous Was a Woman Award; National Endowment for the Arts; American Academy of Arts and Letters
- Website: Judy Fox

Judy Fox, Courtesan, Terra cotta, casein paint, 1996.

Judy Fox is an American sculptor. She was an early forerunner in the 1980s to painted contemporary figuration and the later acceptance of ceramics in the art world, producing work that combined present-day themes and strategies with traditions resurrected from painted renaissance and gothic church carvings. Fox's sculptures and installations reinterpret archetypes, folklore, creation myths and iconic figures from wide-ranging cultures and historical periods. Her terra cotta works range from realistic, ethnically diverse, life-sized nudes—babies, prepubescent children and adults—to surrealist, invented creatures. Alternately regarded as playful, subversive or controversial, they explore gender and multiculturalism, as well as relationships between culture, biology, humanity and primitive life. Carol Diehl commented in Art in America, "Hand-modeled with unusual attention to detail … Fox's work involves paradox and complexity. It falls not only in between cultures, but between the past and the present, the real and the imagined, innocence and sexuality, the sacred and profane, life and death."

Fox received a Guggenheim Fellowship in 2006 and an Anonymous Was a Woman Award in 2002. Her art belongs to the collections of the Albertina and Mumok (Museum Moderner Kunst) in Vienna, the Honolulu Museum of Art and Mint Museum, among others. She is based in Rhinebeck, New York in the Hudson Valley and teaches at the New York Academy of Art.

== Education and exhibitions ==
Fox was born in Elizabeth, New Jersey in 1957. Early interests in sculpture and science led her to study art and biology in college. She attended the Skowhegan School of Painting and Sculpture in 1976 and earned a BA from Yale University in 1978 before studying at the École Nationale Supérieure des Beaux-Arts Paris. As an undergraduate, Fox was drawn to the human form in an era—the late 1970s—when abstraction dominated and figuration was considered passé and exhausted. She learned to model the figure through modernist abstracted form, studying with sculptor Erwin Hauer. She was, however, convinced that the way forward in figuration was by integrating that with the past and its use of human imagery to convey values and psychological insight. Accordingly, she pursued degrees in art history (MA 1983) and conservation (1985) at New York University rather than studio art. In the ensuing two decades, she balanced work restoring modern and contemporary art with her traditional figurative sculpture practice.

Fox began showing in the East Village in the mid-1980s, gaining wider recognition in her first decade through group shows at Jack Tilton Gallery and Exit Art, and through solo exhibitions at Carlo Lamagna Gallery, P.P.O.W. and Christine König Galerie. She appeared in the Venice Biennale (1995) and surveys at the Museum of Contemporary Art, Chicago ("My Little Pretty," 1997), Tate ("Uncanny," 2004), Essl Museum ("Figur Skulptur," 2005) and Chazen Museum of Art ("The Human Condition," 2014). Later solo exhibitions took place at the John Michael Kohler Arts Center (2001) and The Contemporary Museum, Honolulu (2010), and at galleries including P.P.O.W. and Nancy Hoffman in New York, Ace Gallery in Los Angeles and Galerie Thaddaeus Ropac in Paris, among others.

== Work and reception ==
Fox's work fuses the historical and contemporary in terms of sources, influences, themes and effect. It is informed by cultural fields (mythology, folklore, religion, feminism) and science (anatomy, biology). She derives her figures from multiple sources including photographs of models, art historical motifs and mythical archetypes. Her influences range from classical figuration to surrealism extending to biomorphic abstraction.

Critics note Fox's ceramic figures for their meticulous technique, theatrical presentation, anatomical specificity and attentiveness to expression, pose, gesture and detail. Whereas most contemporary figurative sculpture is made by casting the human form from life, Fox's forms are hand-modelled. According to Carol Diehl, the method enables her to achieve a delicacy and vitality, as well as sense of personality, that casting cannot match due to the limitations of that process. When a sculpture is assembled, Fox paints it in rich, but muted casein colors, building numerous thin layers of warm and cool translucent glazes. The process allows underlying colors to show through, yielding convincing suggestions of skin texture, body heat, blood flow, underlying bone and lighting.

Commenters suggest that Fox's work presents viewers with a dichotomy: remarkable realism and familiarity and a simultaneous alien quality. Several writers attribute this to her transpositions of iconic, adult poses and gestures on to the bodies of children, and of idiom, as psychically distanced, stylized types become palpably real individuals in the finished sculptures (e.g., Courtesan, 1995). According to Eleanor Heartney, the breaking of links between poses and gestures and their original cultures disrupts normal readings of such icons, underscoring their artifice as well as the incompleteness of contemporary understanding. Noting a "process of mythological or ceremonial drift," Heartney wrote, "In Fox's work, figures mutate, absorb new meanings, and meld with kindred spirits from other cultures. She reminds us that cultural misunderstandings are not simply destructive. They can also create new mythologies and belief systems."

As with other contemporary artists such as Sally Mann, Fox's figures of children have raised questions about sexuality, innocence and protection, often stemming from a contemporary inclination, particularly in the U.S., to equate nudity and sexuality. Although poses held by a real person may take on additional meanings and emphasis, Fox maintains a high level of faithfulness to the poses and hairdos of her art historical prototypes. In this sense, her works function like mirrors, placing responsibility for interpretation with individual viewer reactions and contemporary tendencies. As a result, critics typically situate her work's thrust on the complexities of gender and the dynamics of cultural and social inculcation rather than voyeurism.

=== Bodies of work and installations ===
Judy Fox, Snow White and the Seven Sins, Installation at The Contemporary Museum, Honolulu. 2010.

Between 1985 and 1996, Fox produced a series of life-sized, nude sculptures she called "fallen putti," which merged babies and various heroic models. The figures drew upon religion (the Virgin Mary, Mohammed, the Buddha), mythology (Sphinx, 1990–92; Bacchante, 1989) and history (e.g., Courtesan, Einstein, 1989) or directly referenced well-known art-historical works, as in Saint Theresa (1993), which borrowed from Bernini’s Ecstasy of Saint Theresa (1645–52). Depicted in an atypically unsentimental manner and exhibiting the complex qualities of the adult figures they impersonate—e.g., transcendence, ecstasy, ferocity—the putti offered a paradox, which New York Times critic Michael Kimmelman deemed "beautifully crafted … very frightening and very funny."

In the 2000s, Fox began presenting allegorical, shrine-like installations suggesting ritual spaces, which combined groups of life-size figures, painted walls and muted lighting. Satyr's Daughters (2000) featured four nude, prepubescent girls posed like dancers on high pedestals; of different ethnic makeup, with historically coiffed hair, they represented various cultural ideals of femininity. They were set in contrast to a naked, satyr-like man looking on from an adjoining gallery, posed in a goatherder's stance on one leg on the floor. The installation placed viewers between images of libidinousness and endangered purity; reviews described it as poised between the timeless and otherworldly, sexuality and innocence, and the possible and fantastical. A counterpart work, Power Figures (2005), featured a nude, voluptuous woman, "Venus" (derived from the Venus of Willendorf), standing on her toes, her face veiled by a basketlike hat. She faced a multiracial quartet of fierce, naked boys standing on chest-high pedestals and raising their right hands in challenging gestures; representing various male types—"divine warrior," "ayatollah," "holy man"—they suggested global encounters and misunderstandings between various cultures.

In subsequent work, Fox paired human figures with expressive, surrealist creatures whose human aspects commented on psychological truths. The installation Snow White And The Seven Sins (2007) was a reinterpretation of the well-known fairy tale, in which Fox presented the title character in a nude but decorous, Pre-Raphaelite manner, lying in state on a glass coffin. She surrounded the figure with surreal, fleshy, roughly two-foot homages to the seven deadly sins, which reviews described as hybrids of human genitalia, Disney references, slugs, crustaceans and dwarf outfits. Critics such as Donald Kuspit suggested that Fox's recasting of the tale portrayed a psychic split between a girl's pure self-ideal and her unconscious fantasies and urges as she transitions to womanhood.

Judy Fox, EdenPlants group, American Academy of Arts and Letters, New York, 2022.

Two later installations reconnected humanity, nudity and sexuality to primitive life and biology using the juxtaposition of contrasting forms. Out of Water (2012) was inspired by a Babylonian creation myth based on the mixing of waters. It centered on a mermaid figure with water-swept hair and bluish-purple, iridescent legs rather than a tail, which Fox surrounded with primordial sculptures of invented sea worms and cephalopods. Critics described the creatures as alien, sweetly grotesque and absurd, and eerily believable as potential natural evolutions of life. Garden (2019) was deemed "Fox's feminist kinking of Eden" and a work of "splendid craftsmanship and perverse imagination" by Artforum. Exploring themes of reproduction, competition and predation, the installation revolved around Eve (2014–17)—a determined-looking, nude modelled after people of Mesopotamian descent—and Snaketree (2015–19), a fruitless and leafless topiary, crowned by a large tangled serpent. Surrounding the sculptures were a series of fantastical carnal and carnivorous breeds of greenery ("EdenPlants," 2016–19) and a pair of petulant, warring boys, Cain and Abel (both 2019).

Fox's exhibition "Harvest" (2023) consisted of whimsical sculptures of fruits and vegetables, fifty in all, some provocatively reminiscent of body parts, gestures or cartoons. Reviewers noted the life-sized and over-sized works for their naturalism, subtle coloration and textures, and tonal mix of humor, anxiety and appetite. Jonathan Goodman of The Brooklyn Rail commented, Fox's works "can, sometimes, move away from art toward a perfectly realized nature … they suggest, in their compilation of curves and mounds, an inventory of nature’s infinite capacity for change."

== Recognition and collections ==
Fox has received a John Simon Guggenheim Memorial Foundation fellowship (2006), awards from Anonymous Was a Woman (2002), the American Academy of Arts and Letters (2002, 2022) and National Academy of Design (2006), and grants from the National Endowment for the Arts (1988, 1994), National Sculpture Society (2008) and New York Foundation for the Arts (2009). She has been awarded artist residencies from MacDowell and Yaddo.

Fox's art is held in the public collections of the Albertina (Vienna), California Center for the Arts, City College of New York, Essl Museum (Austria), Honolulu Museum of Art, Margulies Collection, Mint Museum, Mumok (Vienna), Speed Art Museum and 21C Museum Hotels, among others.
