= Justin Tornow =

American modern dancer and choreographer

- Born: Charlotte, North Carolina
- Education: Providence High School
- Alma mater: University of North Carolina at Greensboro
- Occupations: dancer, choreographer, artistic director, professor, scholar

Justin Tornow is an American dancer, choreographer, dance scholar, and dance teacher. She is the founder and artistic director of COMPANY, a co-founder and co-organizer of Durham Independent Dance Artists, former board president of the North Carolina Dance Alliance, and producer of the PROMPTS art series in Durham, North Carolina. Tornow is trained in Cunningham technique and is a New York Public Library Research Fellow in Cunningham dance pedagogy. She serves on the faculty at the University of North Carolina at Greensboro, Elon University, and the American Dance Festival.

== Early life and education ==
Tornow was raised in Charlotte, North Carolina and attended Providence High School. She graduated from the University of North Carolina at Greensboro with a bachelor's degree in dance and political science in 2001. In 2010 she obtained a Masters of Fine Arts degree in choreography from the University of North Carolina at Greensboro. While in college she trained under Jan Van Dyke.

== Career ==
Upon graduating from the University of North Carolina at Greensboro, Tornow moved to New York City and worked as a dancer there from 2010 until 2013, when she moved to Durham, North Carolina. Tornow is the founder and artistic director of COMPANY, a modern and contemporary dance company based in Durham, and a producer of the Durham artist series PROMPTS. She is also a co-founder and co-organizer of Durham Independent Dance Artists, served as board president for the North Carolina Dance Alliance, and was a member of Black Box Dance Theater Company based in Raleigh, North Carolina. She has collaborated with visual artist Heather Gordon, photographer Alex Maness, and musicians Matthew McClure and Lee Weisert in her choreographic works. Her work has been presented by the UNC Process Series in Chapel Hill, North Carolina; the Sax Open Festival in Strasbourg, France; UGA-Cortona in Cortona, Italy; the Fringe Festival in Greensboro, North Carolina; the Wake Forest Dance Festival in Wake Forest, North Carolina; Triangle Dance Project in Durham, the DUMBO Dance Festival in Brooklyn, New York; CoolNY Festival in New York; the North Carolina Dance Festival, and the Philly Fringe Festival in Philadelphia.

She has been a guest artist for the Rainbow Dance Company, Gaspard and Dancers, William G. Enloe GT/IB Center for the Humanities, Sciences, and the Arts, and North Carolina State University. She is an adjunct professor of dance at the University of North Carolina at Greensboro's College of Visual and Performing Arts and at Elon University and is on faculty at the American Dance Festival. In the spring of 2019 Tornow was an artist in residence at Duke University's Trinity College of Arts and Sciences where she taught and researched Cunningham-based dance technique. Tornow also served as an artist in residence at Tanzart Atelier in Kirschau, Germany and is a New York Public Library Research Fellow in Merce Cunnigham dance pedagogy. In January 2019 Tornow presented Cunningham Technique as a Practice of Freedom at Lincoln Center.

In August 2015, Tornow and COMPANY collaborated with Heather Gordon on a work titled No. 15 which premiered at The Carrack in Durham. On October 7, 2016, Tornow presented her work The Lowest Form of Poetry at the University of Georgia's Hugh Hodgson School of Music. In February 2017 Tornow premiered the piece Echo at 21c Museum Hotel in downtown Durham. The piece was a collaboration between Tornow and Gordon which included site-specific dance, live performance, and pre-recorded video projections. Tornow choreographed and performed the piece as a solo. In July 2017 Tornow and COMPANY performed her work No.19 MODULATIONS at 21c Museum Hotel and at the American Dance Festival's Samuel H. Scripps Studios. In July 2018 COMPANY performed SHOW, a collaboration with Gordon, Maness, and Chris Fleming, at The Fruit in Durham.

Tornow is a recipient of the 2015–2016 Ella Fountain Pratt Emerging Artists Award for dance.

In April 2019 Tornow was awarded an artist residency at The Commons, a performing arts initiative of Carolina Performing Arts.
