= Richie Shaffer =

American baseball player and gamer (born 1991)

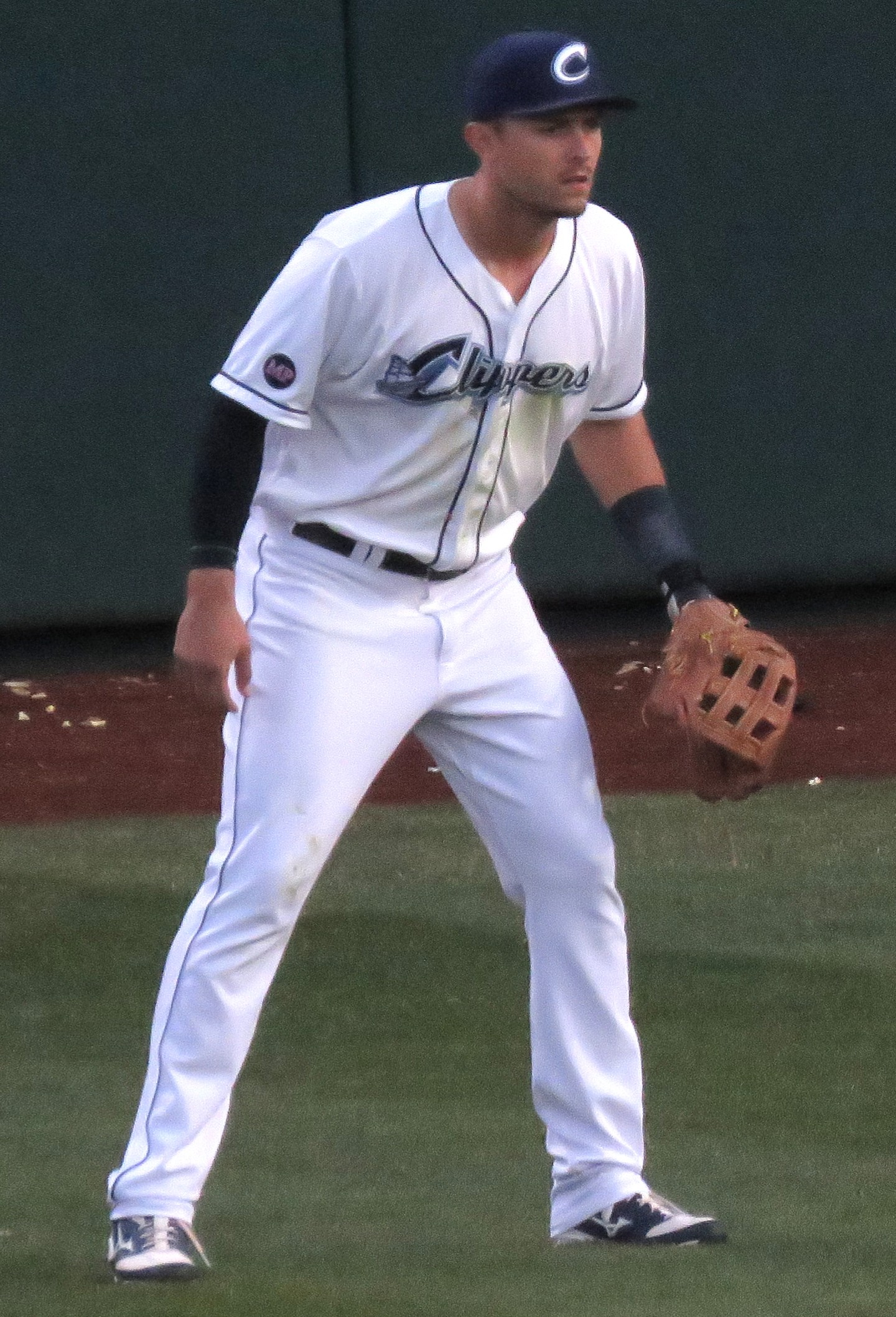
- Shaffer with the Columbus Clippers in 2018.
- Third baseman / First baseman
- Born: March 15, 1991 (age 35); Flemington, New Jersey, U.S.
- Batted: Right Threw: Right

MLB debut
- August 3, 2015, for the Tampa Bay Rays

Last MLB appearance
- October 2, 2016, for the Tampa Bay Rays

MLB statistics
- Batting average: .213
- Home runs: 5
- Runs batted in: 10
- Stats at Baseball Reference

Teams
- Tampa Bay Rays (2015–2016)

Richard Michael Shaffer (born March 15, 1991) is an American former professional baseball third baseman and first baseman. He played in Major League Baseball (MLB) for the Tampa Bay Rays. Since retiring from baseball, he is a live video gaming personality on the streaming platform Twitch, performing under the character name "Dicky Danger". He has also begun to pursue writing and in October 2020 published his debut novel: The Eight of Earth: A Novel.

== Career ==
=== Amateur ===
Shaffer was drafted by the Los Angeles Dodgers in the 25th round of the 2009 Major League Baseball draft out of Providence High School in Charlotte, North Carolina. He did not sign and attended Clemson University. During his college baseball career with the Clemson Tigers, he hit .325/.449/.562 with 30 home runs and 137 runs batted in. In 2011, he played collegiate summer baseball with the Chatham Anglers of the Cape Cod Baseball League.

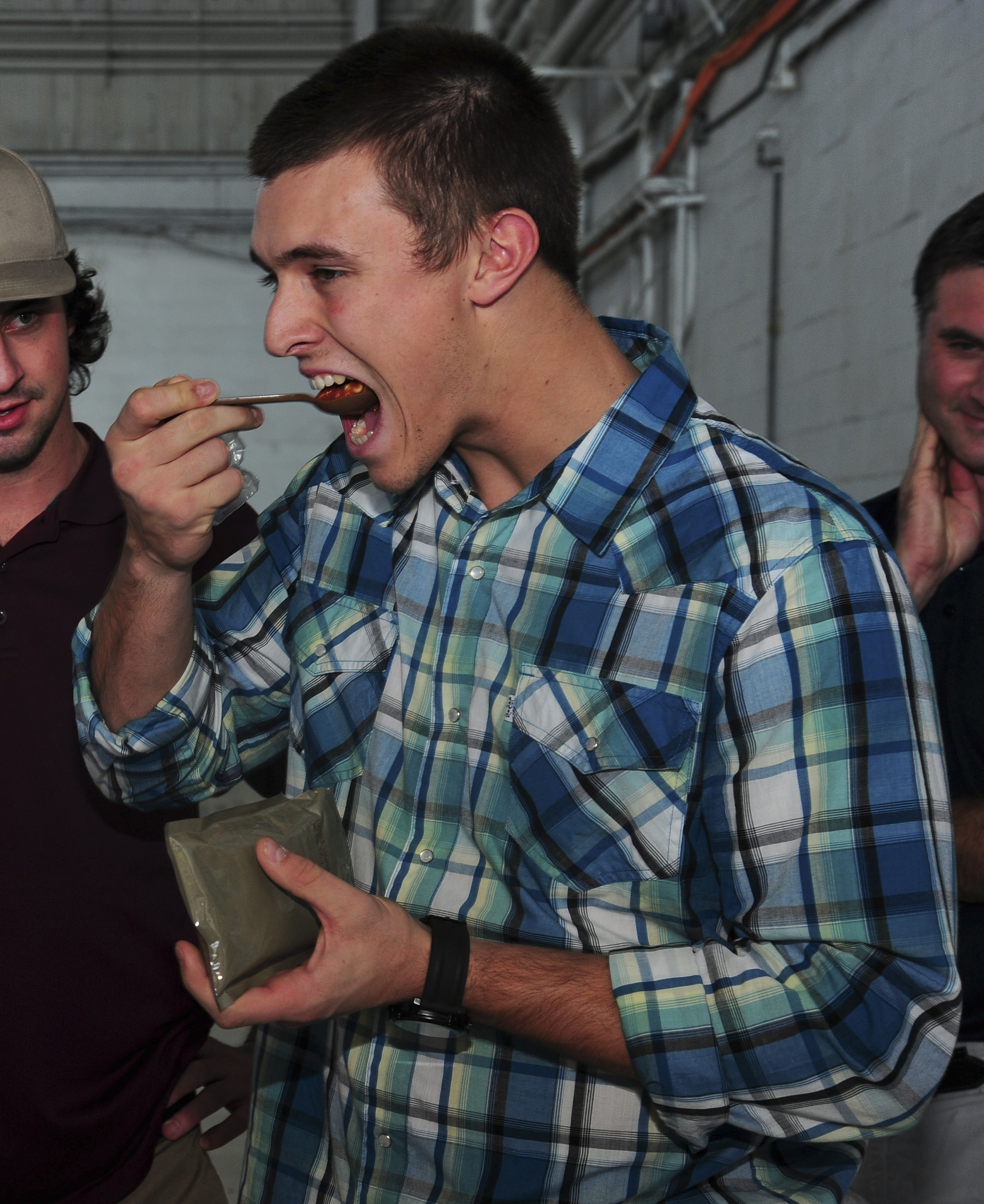
Shaffer at MacDill Air Force Base in 2013

=== Tampa Bay Rays ===
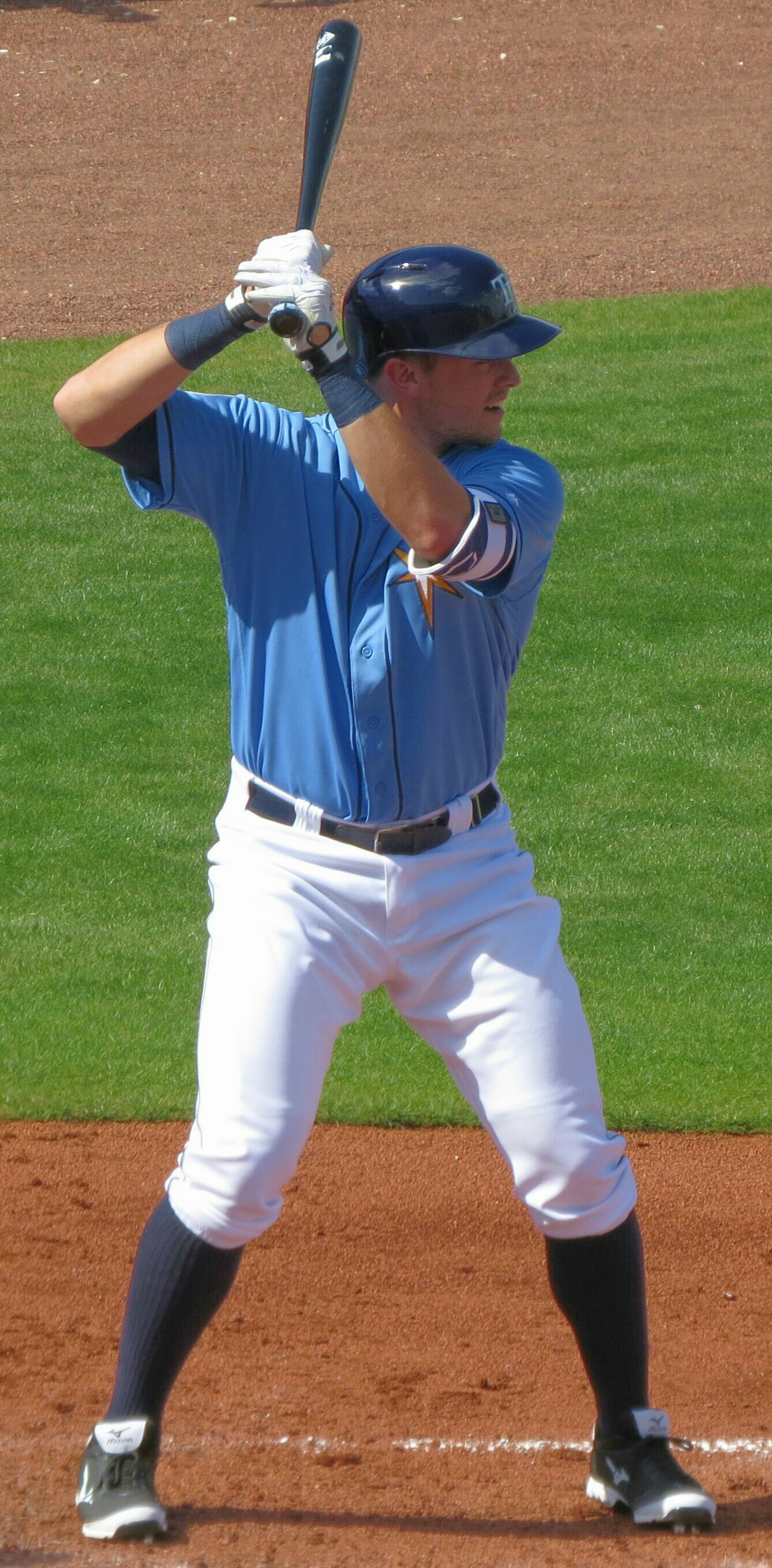
Shaffer with the Tampa Bay Rays in 2016

The Tampa Bay Rays selected Shaffer in the first round, with the 25th overall selection, of the 2012 Major League Baseball draft. He made his professional debut for the Hudson Valley Renegades of the Class A-Short Season New York–Penn League, hitting .308/.406/.487 and four home runs in 33 games. In 2013, he played for the Charlotte Stone Crabs of the Class A-Advanced Florida State League, hitting .254/.308/.399 with 11 home runs. He played in the Arizona Fall League after the season. He started the 2014 season for the Montgomery Biscuits of the Class AA Southern League.

Shaffer began the 2015 season with the Biscuits, and received a midseason promotion to the Durham Bulls of the Class AAA International League. On August 3, 2015, the Rays promoted Shaffer to the major leagues. Shaffer ended his 2016 season with a .250 batting average.

=== Seattle Mariners ===
On November 18, 2016, the Rays traded Shaffer and Taylor Motter to the Seattle Mariners for Andrew Kittredge, Dalton Kelly and Dylan Thompson. Shaffer was designated for assignment by the Mariners on December 7, after acquiring Chris Heston.

=== Philadelphia Phillies ===
The Philadelphia Phillies claimed Shaffer off of waivers on December 14. He was designated for assignment by Philadelphia on December 20.

=== Cincinnati Reds ===
The Cincinnati Reds claimed him off waivers from the Phillies on December 23.

=== Cleveland Indians ===
Shaffer was claimed off waivers by the Cleveland Indians on January 26, 2017, and then designated for assignment by them on January 30. Shaffer was subsequently outrighted to the minor leagues on February 2, 2017. He was released from the organization on June 6, 2018.

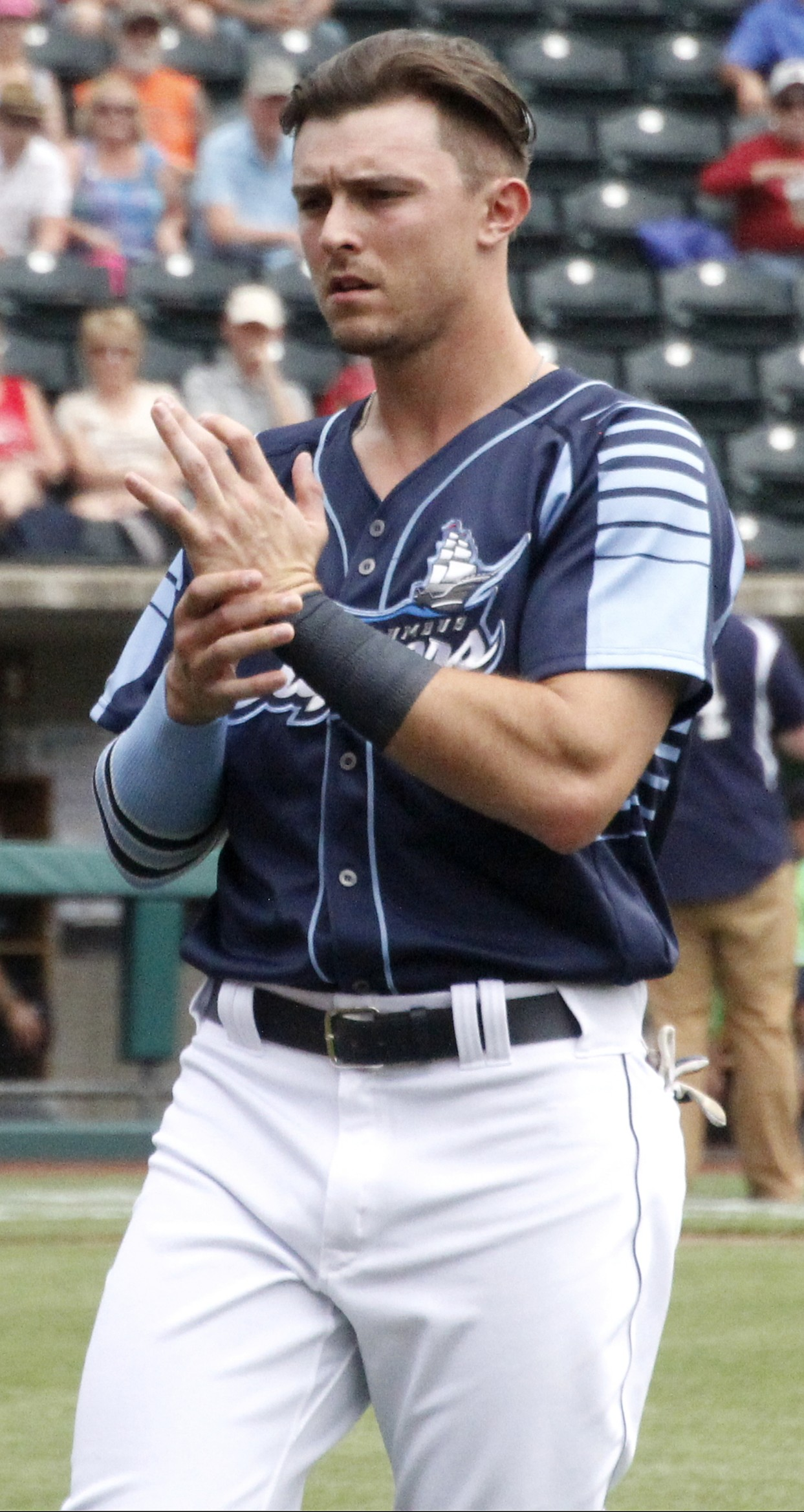
Shaffer with the Columbus Clippers in 2018

=== Milwaukee Brewers ===
Shaffer was signed to a minor league contract with the Milwaukee Brewers on July 20, 2018. After being signed, he was sent to Triple A Colorado Springs Sky Sox. Shaffer became a free agent after the season on November 2.

=== High Point Rockers ===
On April 11, 2019, Shaffer signed with the High Point Rockers of the Atlantic League of Professional Baseball. He became a free agent following the season. In 110 games he hit .235/.346/.510 with 27 home runs, 72 RBIs and 2 stolen bases.
