= Hotel Metropole (Cincinnati, Ohio) =

- U.S. National Register of Historic Places
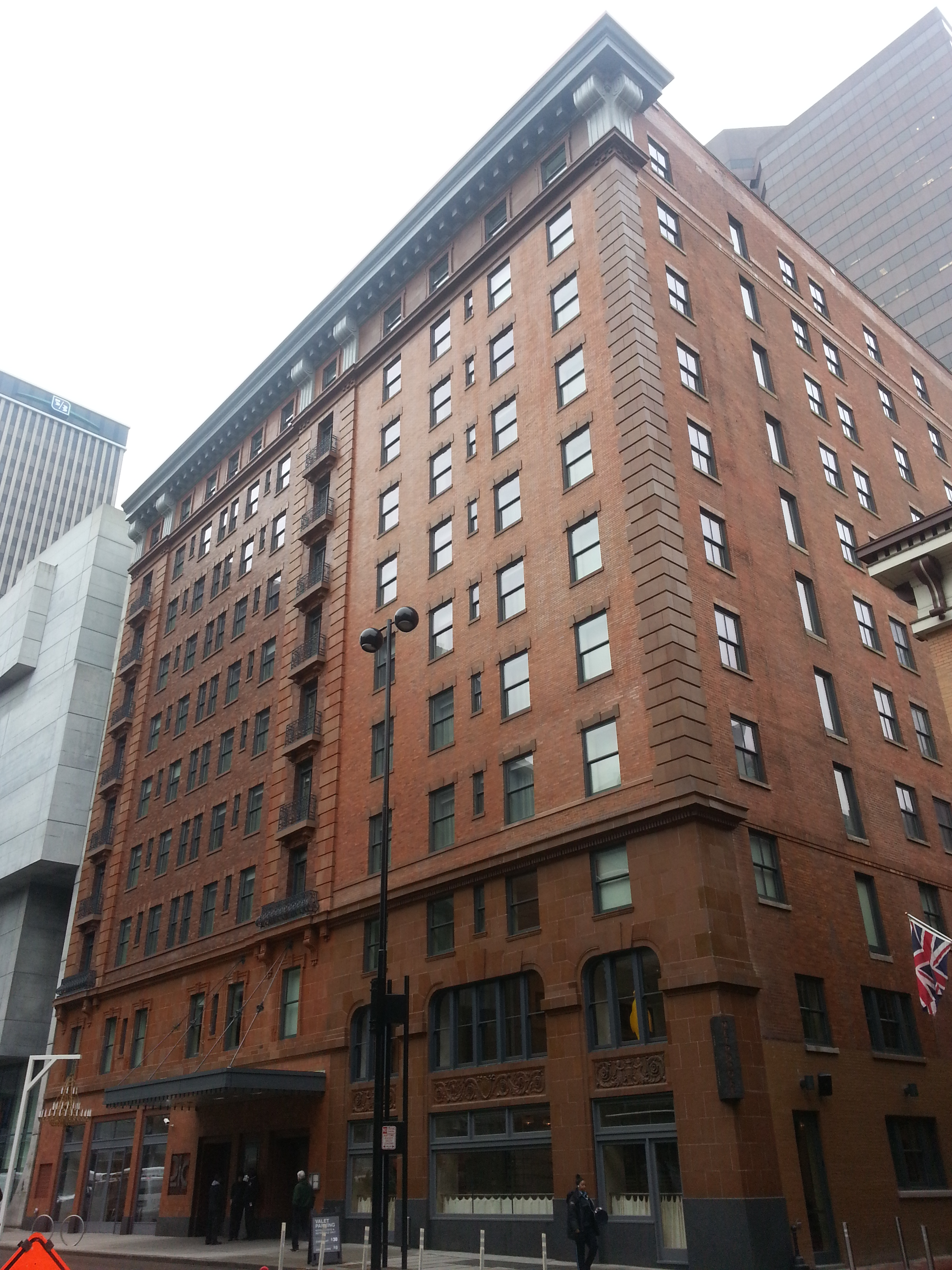

- Location within Ohio Location within the United States
- Location: 609 Walnut St., Cincinnati, Ohio
- Coordinates: 39°06′11″N 84°30′43″W
- Area: Less than 1 acre (0.40 ha)
- Built: 1913
- Architect: Joseph G. Steinkamp & Brother
- Architectural style: Neoclassical
- NRHP reference No.: 09000443
- Added to NRHP: June 18, 2009

The Hotel Metropole is a Neoclassical hotel in downtown Cincinnati, Ohio. Conceived by lawyer Joseph C. Thoms and designed by architectural firm Joseph Steinkamp & Brother, the hotel opened in 1913. In 1973, the hotel became a low-income apartment building under the name Mid-Towne Apartments, but was converted back into a hotel in 2012.

== History ==
The Hotel Metropole was conceived by lawyer Joseph C. Thoms, who believed that Cincinnati had a dearth of luxury hotels. Thoms hired architectural firm Joseph Steinkamp & Bro. to design the Neoclassical building. The name "Hotel Metropole" was announced on May 17, 1912. A management corporation for the hotel, named the Hotel Metropole Cafe Company, was established on June 22 with a capitalization of $100,000. On September 13, a dispute between the International Association of Steamfitters and the United Association of Plumbers and Steamfitters resulted in a strike of nearly 2000 workers across several large projects in Cincinnati, including the Hotel Metropole and the Fourth and Vine Tower. The strike was called off on September 28, and work on the hotel resumed that day. 20 carpenters went on strike on December 2 after sheet metal workers were tasked with installing elevator doors. As the doors were wooden with a metal covering, the carpenters stated that they should perform the installation. The strike, which by then involved 27 carpenters, was resolved on December 11. Unhappy with the elevator doors being given to the carpenters, over 150 men from 12 unions began another strike on December 13.

The total cost of construction was $324,271. The hotel initially targeted an opening date in September 1912, but was unable to open until April 1 of the following year due to the labor disputes. The delay cost the Cafe Company $115,000. As it opened during a "dull season" for hotels, the Metropole struggled to attract business in its early months and was unable to sell its stock. The Cafe Company did not believe that it could financially support the hotel for the remainder of the dull season, and the company's Board of Directors decided to place the hotel into receivership on July 17. A judge appointed Theodore Foucar as the hotel's receiver the following day after a company shareholder filed a lawsuit. Foucar's receivership prevented the hotel from acquiring a liquor license, as Foucar was already the owner of a saloon and the Liquor License Commission refused to grant two licenses to the same person. Foucar announced his intent to resign as receiver due to the licensing issue. J. Harry Asmann, Jr. became the Metropole's new receiver on October 1.

By September 1914, the receivership had "not panned out as expected", and Asmann submitted an application to sell the building. A judge approved the application on September 21, and a sale was set for November 2. Thoms, who owned the building itself, was the only person to submit a bid for the hotel, but a judge determined that his offer was "unsatisfactory" on November 7. On December 12, a judge ruled that the hotel would be closed on December 21 if no bids were submitted. Thoms submitted a new bid of $25,000, but former Gibson House manager George W. Martin bid $26,500. A judge ordered Asmann to accept Martin's offer on December 19. The hotel generated over $216,000 in revenue over the course of Asmann's receivership, but only made a net profit of $150. After the sale, the Metropole had $34,000 in outstanding claims against the receiver, while Thoms was owed $9500 in rent. Unsatisfied with the prospect of splitting Martin's $26,500, several of the hotel's creditors sought individual payment of their liens. By early 1916, Thoms had purchased the hotel.

By February 21, 1916, Thoms had purchased the northwestern corner of Sixth and Walnut Streets for $425,000 with the intention of constructing an annex for the Metropole on the site. On September 8, 1923, the Metropole's manager announced plans for a $1 million, 330-room expansion of the north side of the hotel. In 1924, an 11th floor penthouse apartment was added. The addition, which ultimately added 200 rooms at a cost of $1,248,636, opened on May 4, 1925.

In February 1946, Hotel Metropole, Inc. was established to manage the hotel following an imminent sale. The sale was scheduled to be completed on March 26. Under the deal, the Thoms estate would sell the hotel to a Detroit syndicate led by Milton Saffir and Rubin Kowall for $700,000, $550,000 of which would be lent by the State Mutual Life Assurance Co. The new owners assumed control of hotel operations by March 28.

In November 1970, developer Mid-Towne Associates began negotiating with the Federal Housing Administration (FHA) over a plan to convert the Metropole into a low to moderate-income apartment building. Albert Harris of Harris Realty Inc. represented Hotel Metropole, Inc. in the negotiations. The converted building would contain 220 efficiency apartments and 10 one-bedroom apartments alongside resident amenities. Tenants would need to have incomes below set thresholds, and 20 out of every 100 residents would be eligible for federal rent subsidies from the FHA. On July 12, 1971, the FHA tentatively approved the plan and committed $202,360 to the project. On October 14, Mid-Towne announced that it planned to purchase the building and would commence the conversion. The cost of the project was estimated to be $3,557,758, with $1 million going towards acquisition of the land and $2 million going towards construction. The conversion was slated to be financed by a 40-year, FHA-guaranteed loan of $3,130,700 from Kentucky Mortgage Co., Inc. and First National Bank of Louisville. The building reopened as Mid-Towne Apartments in January 1973.

In February 1983, the Department of Housing and Urban Development (HUD) released an audit which found that Mid-Towne Associates was not compliant with HUD's regulatory agreement. The audit stated that Mid-Towne partner Samuel T. Isaac misappropriated $186,074 in project funds between February 1973 and August 1982. After the release of the audit, the federal government filed a foreclosure suit against Mid-Towne Associates for defaulting on its HUD payments. On January 19, 1984, Isaac pled guilty to diverting $117,515 of rent and "other funds" from Mid-Towne Apartments before Judge William Hart. By February 1991, the building had adopted the name "Metropole Apartments".

By 2006, the Metropole was experiencing high levels of drug use and prostitution, and Cincinnati Police Department Chief Tom Streicher stated that crime from the building was "making it tough" for the Aronoff Center and nearby restaurants. On July 14 of that year, police raided the building after a two-month investigation. Police arrested nine people, including seven for drug charges, and seized various drugs as well as two firearms. The Cincinnati Enquirer referred to this raid as the "peak" of criminality at the building. Following the raid, county courts applied a memorandum of understanding to the building that required it to enhance security measures. In 2009, Streicher stated that the memorandum "did help some", but the Metropole was "still a constant source of problems for us and the central business district... it's basically an epicenter for the problems we have downtown".

In June 2009, the Hotel Metropole was added to the National Register of Historic Places. Later that year, 3CDC purchased the Metropole from Showe Builders Inc. for $6.5 million. 3CDC announced that it would work with Louisville-based 21c Museum Hotels to convert the building into a luxury hotel with 160 guest rooms, an 8000 square-foot contemporary art museum, a restaurant, and meeting space. 3CDC and 21c planned to cover 95% of the projected cost of $48 million, with the remainder expected to come from the city. Deborah Berke Partners was hired to design the hotel. The conversion plan was criticized by affordable housing groups in Cincinnati, which expressed their desire for the building to continue to serve as low or moderate-income housing. 3CDC stated that it would cover the relocation costs of Metropole residents. On August 18, 2010, Metropole tenants filed a federal lawsuit against the city, 3CDC, and HUD in an attempt to stop the conversion. The suit stated that the conversion "would reduce the housing stock available to low-income people and create more racial segregation in the city". On September 21, 2011, the developers agreed to give the plaintiffs $80,000 as part of a settlement.

The converted building's restaurant opened on November 12, 2012, and the hotel itself followed on November 26 under the name 21c Museum Hotel. The total cost of the conversion was $48 million. The Condé Nast Traveler named it the top hotel in the United States in 2013. In 2019, the hotel was inducted into Historic Hotels of America, the official program of the National Trust for Historic Preservation.

On October 29, 2025, 21c sold the hotel for $25 million to Walnut St Hotel LLC, which is managed by a Lexington, Kentucky-based investment group. 21c signed a lease with the investment group to operate the hotel for an additional year. The group is considering Accor, Hilton, Marriott, and Hyatt as future operators. The group obtained a $16.4 million loan and a $3.4 million line of credit from Huntington National Bank in order to fund renovations of the hotel.
