= Contemporary Art Museum of Raleigh =

Art museum in Raleigh, North Carolina

Coordinates: 35°46′37″N 78°38′44.5″W

CAM Raleigh
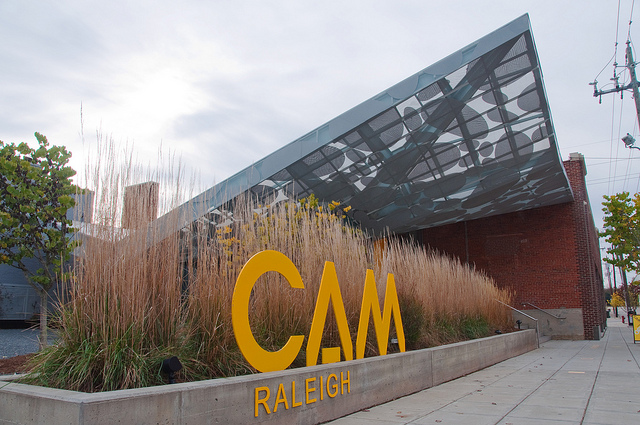

General information
- Type: Art museum
- Location: 409 W Martin Street; Raleigh, North Carolina, U.S.
- Opened: 1983

Website
- camraleigh.org

Contemporary Art Museum of Raleigh, often styled as CAM Raleigh, is a multimedia contemporary art gallery in Raleigh, North Carolina. The museum has no permanent collection but offers exhibitions of works by artists with regional, national, and international recognition. Exhibitions have included works by Angel Otero, Marilyn Minter, Heather Gordon, Leonardo Drew, Sarah Cain, Dorian Lynde and Jonathan Horowitz. The museum has been temporarily closed since 2026.

== History ==
CAM Raleigh was founded in 1983 as the City Gallery of Contemporary Art and for a time was operated by the College of Design of North Carolina State University.

On June 3, 2025, CAM Raleigh announced that as of June 15 it would temporarily pause on-site exhibitions and in-house programming to reassess its future. External collaborations and community partnerships would remain active. On August 3, 2026 CAM Raleigh announced it was selling its gallery location in the Warehouse District. In use since 2011, the gallery was a 1910 warehouse providing 20,000 square feet of space. The facility was re-purposed by Brooks + Scarpa.
