= David Herbert (artist) =

American sculptor (born 1977)

David Herbert. Beautiful Superman (2007).

David Herbert (born July 16, 1977) is an American sculptor. He remakes cultural icons such as Mickey Mouse, Superman and a VHS cassette.

== Life ==
David Herbert was born in Seattle, Washington. He gained a B.F.A. from the Cornish College of the Arts in Seattle and an M.F.A. from Virginia Commonwealth University in Richmond.

== Art career ==
Herbert worked initially with video, before changing to sculpture.

In July 2006, Herbert's VHS, a giant replica of a videocassette of 2001: A Space Odyssey was exhibited at Postmasters Gallery in New York City.

In December 2006, in The Bong Show at the Leslie Tonkonow Gallery in New York, Herbert's Creature from Bong Water Bog, was a green head with scales, twice life-size, open mouth and partially underwater in a glass tank.

In January 2007, his solo show, I (heart) New York, took place at the Postmasters Gallery in New York. The center of the show was a 14-foot (4.2 m) tall sculpture of a decaying Empire State Building. Drawings included a depression era speaker and a burning flag with a KKK member.

Herbert was included in Postmaster Gallery's installation at the 2007 Miami Pulse festival. In 2008, in the show Amerika: Back to the Future at the Postmasters Gallery, he exhibited a foam-core model of the "Starship Enterprise", supported by a wooden framework and with Paleolithic markings all over it, and also a depiction of Mickey Mouse—"retro-primitivist sculptures [which] reconfigure 20th century icons ... as crudely constructed stone-age totems".

In March 2009, his work appeared in the America festival Discover US! in Berlin, which presented 18 contemporary US artists. Herbert used American entertainment icons as a subject, transforming Superman into a skeletal figure of pain and Mickey Mouse into a feeble puppet, pointing to the reality behind the travesty of everyday life.

In June 2008, two works, Beautiful Superman and Western Model, were included in Freedom, the eleventh staging of The Hague Sculpture in The Hague, focusing that year on sculpture of American artists active since 1958. The exhibition took place in the Lange Voorhout avenue and was opened by the Mayor, Jozias van Aartsen; the theme of freedom was chosen for its particular association with the United States. Herbert was provided with accommodation and made his work in the Zijderveld studio in liaison with the carpentry workshop. Western Model is an object which fuses a wooden car with a house on top of it; the car is modelled on the Ford Model T.

His solo show Nostalgia for Infinity took place at the Postmasters Gallery in May 2009, and took as its starting point work by illustrators and animators to make "playful, mixed-media sculptures of architectural and pop cultural monuments in various states of deconstruction and dilapidation." He reconstructed out of chicken wire and spray foam a large version of Ridley Scott's alien, titled Monarch, showing the alien with a butterfly on its hand and sitting in a rocking chair. He transcribed the first Mickey Mouse cartoon, Steamboat Willie, in a stop-motion video, Séance for the Symphony, with flatulent sounds in the background and crude cardboard characters, with the result that "The tension between the cartoon and its humble re-creation educes a drama that’s both sad and beautiful."

In December 2009, Don't Flee the Artmarket was a group show at the Postmasters Gallery of nearly 300 works, one of the "quirky highlights" being Herbert's portraits in graphite of a sad lost R2-D2 and C-3PO. Herbert lives and works in New York.

== Collections ==
- 21c Museum
- Saatchi Gallery
- Tacoma Art Museum
