= Legends Nightclub (Raleigh, North Carolina) =

LGBTQ nightclub in Raleigh, North Carolina

- Interactive map of Legends Nightclub
- Address: 330 West Hargett Street; Raleigh, North Carolina; United States
- Coordinates: 35.7786°N 78.6448°W
- Type: Gay bar

Construction
- Opened: 1991

Website
- legends-club.com

Legends Nightclub Complex, more commonly referred to as Legends, is an LGBTQ nightclub in the Raleigh, North Carolina. The club is located in the Warehouse District, a historic gay village in the city's downtown. It is one of Raleigh's oldest LGBTQ bars.

== History ==
In 1991, Legends NightClub, an 18+ gay club, opened in the Warehouse District, Raleigh's historic gay village. It is one of the oldest LGBTQ bars in Raleigh. The building that houses the club, on West Hargett Street, was constructed in 1958. The club also served as a Sunday meeting place for St. John's Metropolitan Community Church and hosted the Aids Alliance of North Carolina monthly to do HIV/AIDS testing and education.

In 2020, the Legend's owners, Tim Bivens and Matt Cozzi, sold Legends to CityPlat for $4.3 million. Bivens stated that the deal was to ensure "the long-term survival of Legends as an ongoing business."

In 2026, the club announced they would close their 330 West Hargett Street in October 2026, with the last night of operations being October 18. They will reopen at a new location, 316 West Cabarrus Street, in the Warehouse District, on October 23, 2026.

== See also ==
- List of LGBTQ bars
