= Barbara Lerner Spectre =

Academic and philosophy lecturer

- Born: 1942 (age 83–84); Madison, Wisconsin, U.S.
- Education: Barnard College; New York University
- Occupations: Academic; philosopher
- Known for: Founding director of Paideia
- Spouse: Philip Spectre

Barbara Lerner Spectre (born 1942) is an academic and philosophy lecturer, who is the founding director of Paideia, the European Institute for Jewish Studies in Sweden, a non-denominational academic institute established in 2001.

== Biography ==
Barbara Spectre was born in Madison, Wisconsin. She studied philosophy and received a Bachelor of Arts degree at Columbia University and a Master of Arts degree at NYU, then attaining a PhD in philosophy at Bar-Ilan University, Israel. She married Rabbi Philip Spectre, and the couple moved in 1967 to Ashkelon, Israel, where she served on the faculty of Jewish Studies at Achva College of Education. After moving to Jerusalem in 1982, she served on the philosophy faculty of the Shalom Hartman Institute of Jerusalem, the Melton Center of the Hebrew University, and Yellin College of Education, where she was cited as Outstanding Lecturer 1995–1997. She was the founding chairperson of the Schechter Institute in Jerusalem in 1984. She served as a scholar in residence for the United Synagogues, Midwest Regions in 1987, 1990, 1992, 1996, and has lectured extensively throughout the United States.

In 1999, she emigrated to Sweden, settling in Stockholm and joining her husband, who was then serving as the Rabbi of the Stockholm Synagogue. The following year, she applied to the Swedish government for the government-funded formation of Paideia, the European Institute for Jewish Studies, which she has continued to direct. In its first decade of existence (2001–2011), Paideia trained over 200 persons from 35 countries for leadership positions in the renewal of Jewish culture in Europe.

Barbara Spectre has garnered attention for her quote, from an interview in an IBA News report about the wave of anti-semitism in Sweden. Spectre stated her view that the rise of anti-semitism is directly related to the leading role Jews are playing in the transformation of Europe into a multicultural society. (Note: Full quote: "I think there is a resurgence of anti-semitism, because at this point in time Europe has not yet learned how to be multicultural. And I think we are going to be part of the throes of that transformation, which must take place. Europe is not going to be the monolithic societies that they once were in the last century. Jews are going to be at the centre of that. It's a huge transformation for Europe to make. They are now going into a multicultural mode and Jews will be resented because of our leading role. But without that leading role and without that transformation, Europe will not survive.") Numerous clips of the interview have since been uploaded on YouTube, garnering hundreds of thousands of views and eliciting a far-right nationalist reaction, in connection with the purported Jewish role in the white genocide conspiracy theory. Her statement has also been parodied in a YouTube video "Anti-Racist Hitler", by a white nationalist radio station White Rabbit Radio, garnering 180,000 views in 2013, before its removal from the channel.

== Awards ==
- The King's Medal in gold of the 8th size (Kon:sGM8, 2018) for prominent efforts for the Jewish culture in Sweden and abroad

== Publications ==
- "Educating Jewish Leaders in a Pan-European Perspective", International Handbook of Jewish Education, Springer, 2011
- A Different Light: The Hannukah Book of Celebration, Two Volumes, co-editor with Noam Zion, Devora Press, 2000.
- PhD, Bar-Ilan University, Philosophy, "Models of Theological Response to the Holocaust in Christian and Jewish Thought"
