= Warehouse District (Raleigh, North Carolina) =

Neighborhood in Raleigh, North Carolina

Coordinates: 35.7771°N 78.6453°W

- Raleigh neighborhood
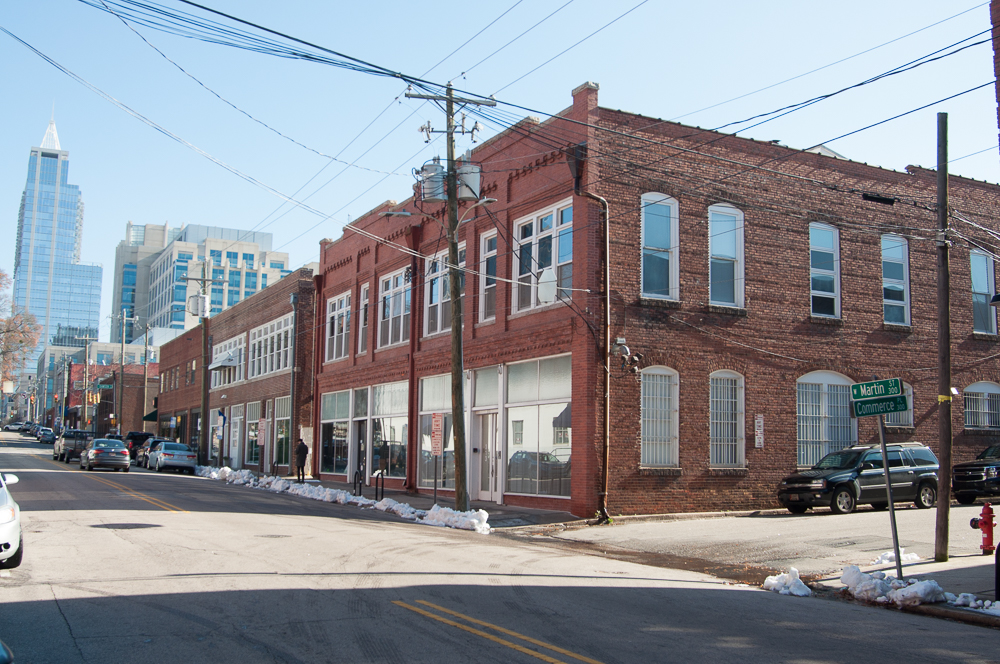
- Former warehouses in the Raleigh Warehouse District
- Interactive map of Warehouse District
- Country: United States
- State: North Carolina
- City: Raleigh
- Time zone: EST

The Warehouse District is a major downtown district in Raleigh, North Carolina. Located three blocks west of the Raleigh Convention Center, it is a growing arts, restaurant, nightlife, and entrepreneurial district consisting of six blocks of red-brick buildings, most of which are repurposed warehouses, factories and depots. A LGBTQ-friendly district, it includes Raleigh's historic gay village, located between Dawson Street and Harrington Street, and is often referred to as the Raleigh Gayborhood.

== History ==
The Warehouse District was built initially as an industrial zone due to its proximity to the rail lines several blocks West of downtown Raleigh. The warehouse, depot, and factory buildings fell out of use in the mid 1950s. Many of the buildings were in a state of disrepair by the late 1970s and early 1980s when artists, designers, and performers began making use of the spaces again, including a young David Sedaris. By the late 1980s much of the district had found use as galleries, studio space, poetry reading space, and woodworking shop.

Nightlife venues came to the district in the form of The Berkley and the Capital Coral, Culture Club, and Fallout Shelter in the mid to late 1980s. Capital Coral, which opened at 313 Hargett Street in 1976, was Raleigh's first gay bar for men. The bar, originally a country western bar and later a disco nightclub, was a member's only club that did not permit entry to women unless they were accompanied by a male member. In 1979, The Front-Page Newspaper was started by Jim Baxter, catering to the LGBTQ community and advertising local bars, nightlife, and businesses. The paper was later operated out of White Rabbit Books & Things, a LGBTQ book store operated by John Neal on West Martin Street, from 1991 until its last press in 2006. In 1991, Legends NightClub, an 18+ gay club, opened in the district. The club's owners, Tim Bivens and Matt Cozzi, sold Legends in 2020 for $4.3 million to CityPlat. Bivens stated that the deal was to ensure "the long-term survival of Legends as an ongoing business." FLEX, another gay bar, is located in the district. Today the Warehouse District is home to several restaurants in addition to nightlife and art venues. The district now features several craft beer establishments including Crank Arm Brewing, Boylan Street Brewpub, Tasty beverage Company, and Brewmasters Bar & Grill.

The 2010s saw a surge of business growth in the district. In 2011, the Contemporary Art Museum of Raleigh moved into a 20,000-square-foot warehouse in the district. Citrix opened a 550-employee division headquarters in the former Dillon Supply building in 2014. HQ Raleigh, a co-working space with 45 businesses, announced its move to Warehouse District in 2013. Local business leaders said the district was "starting to create an entrepreneurial reputation."

Maeve, a 20-story 297-unit apartment building, opened in April 2025. Capital Square bought 1.1 acres at 319 West Lenoir Street in 2021 and developed the property using funding from CSRA Opportunity Zone Fund VI, LLC. $100 million was spent in what was considered a low income district.

== Events ==
- CueGrass Festival - Annual BBQ, beer, and bluegrass festival held in the Warehouse District.
- First Friday Gallery Walk - Gallery crawl held the first Friday evening of each month.

== Gallery ==
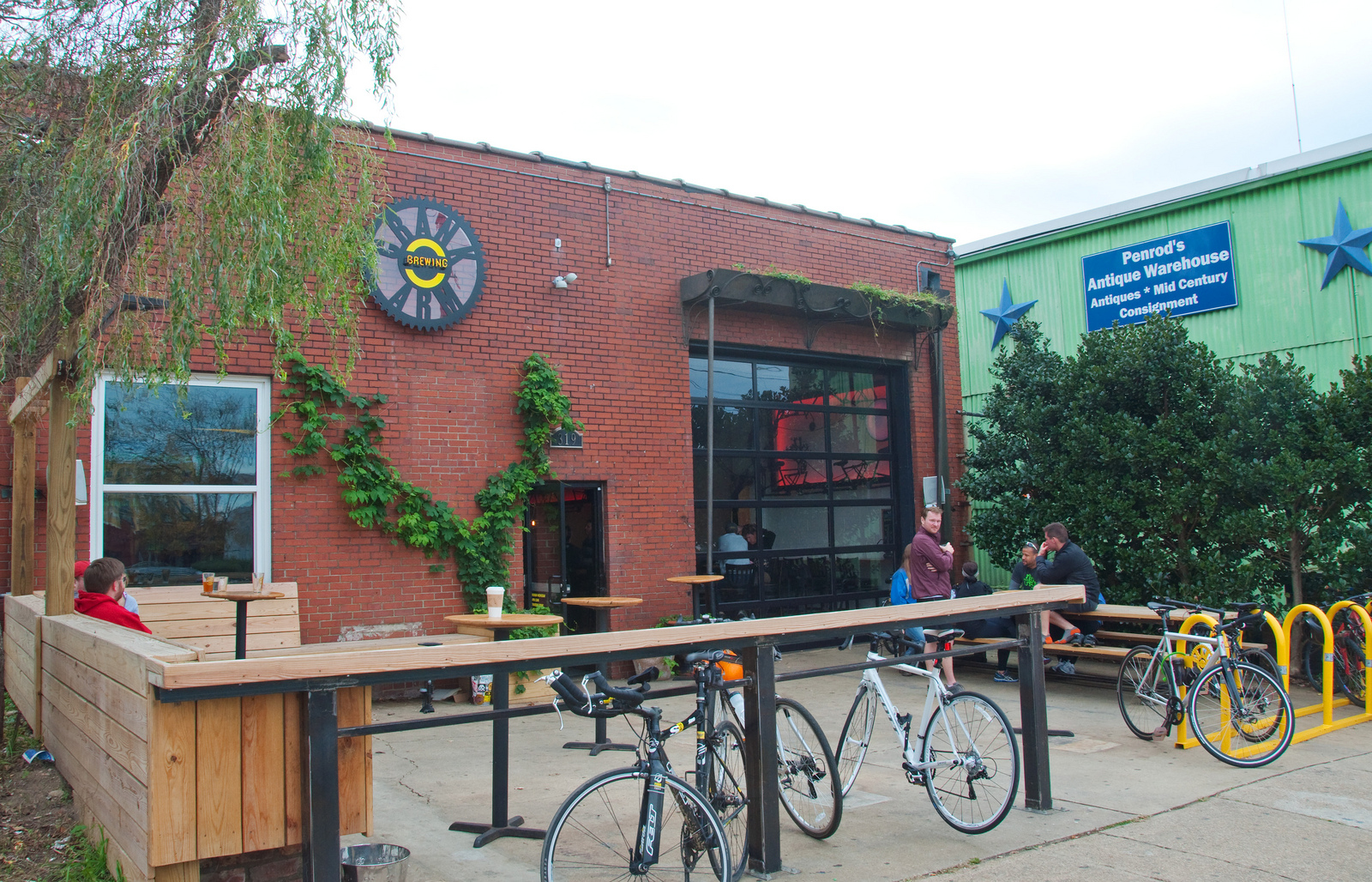
Crank Arm Brewing

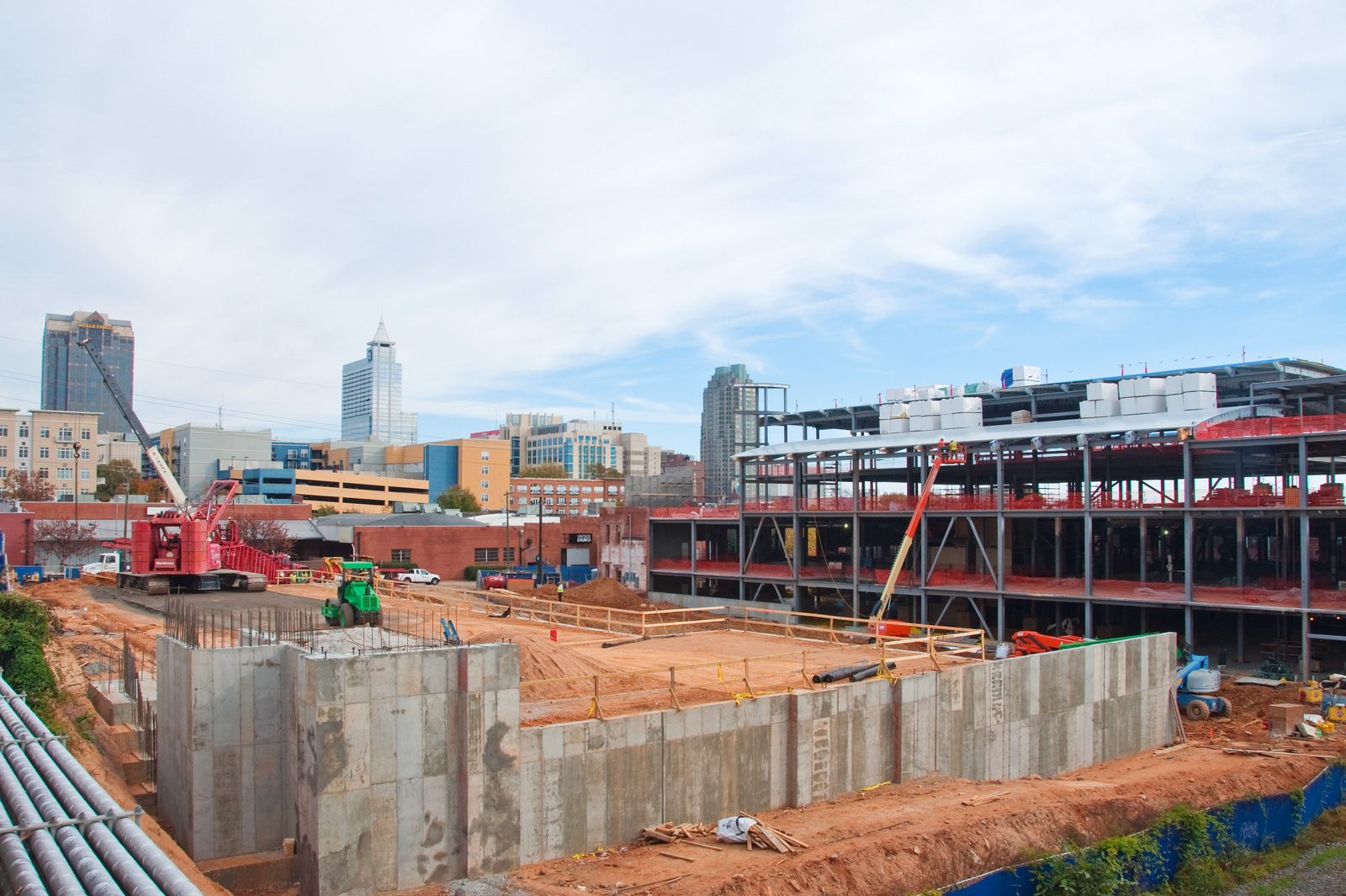
Citrix headquarters construction (2013)

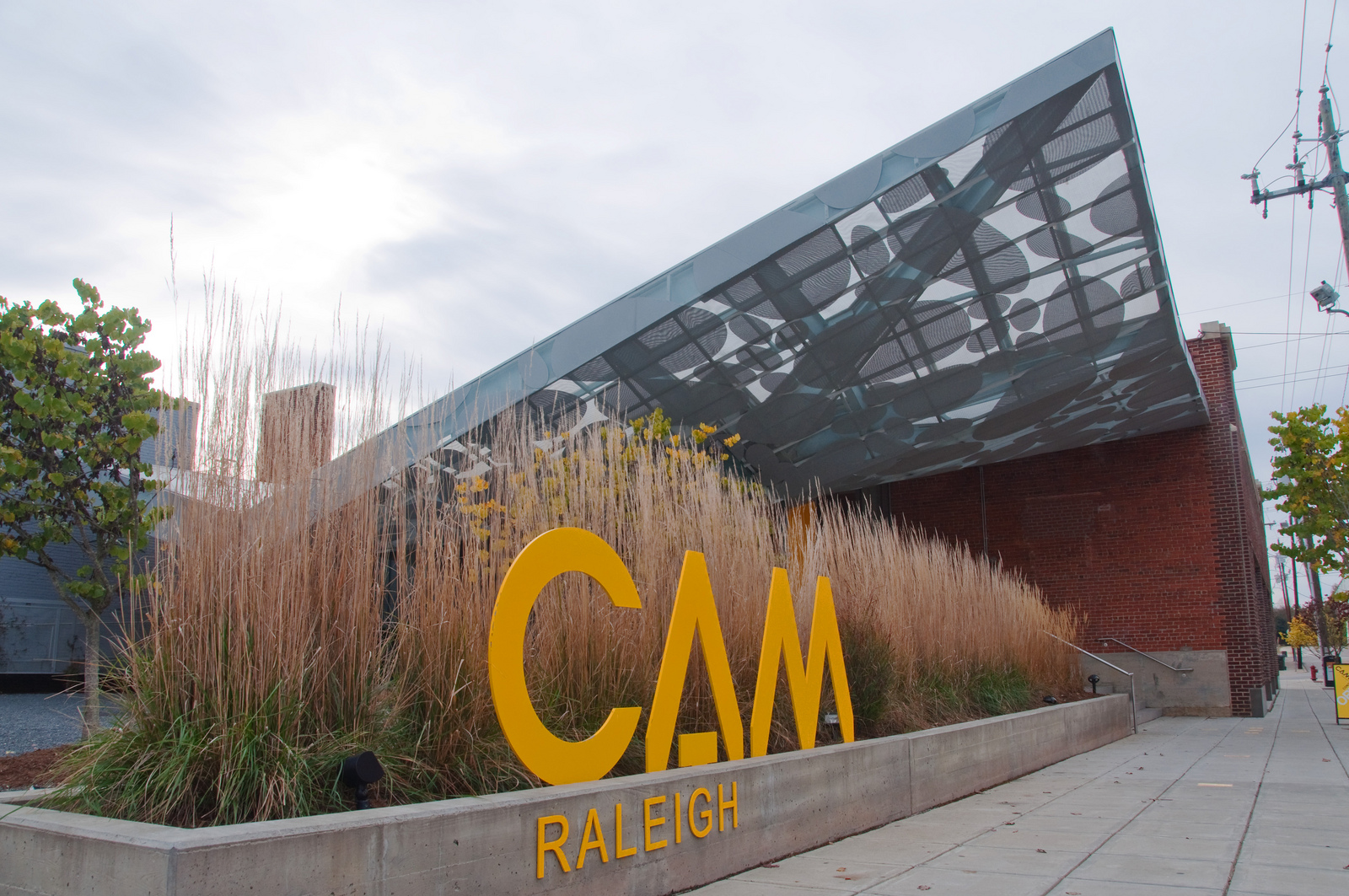
Contemporary Art Museum

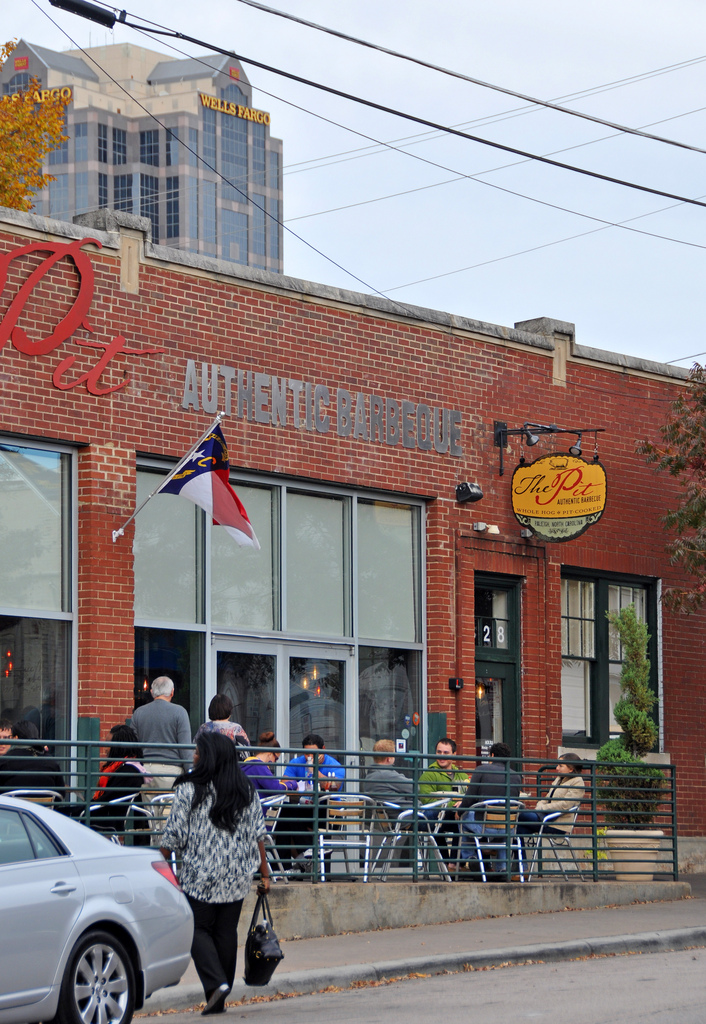
The Pit BBQ

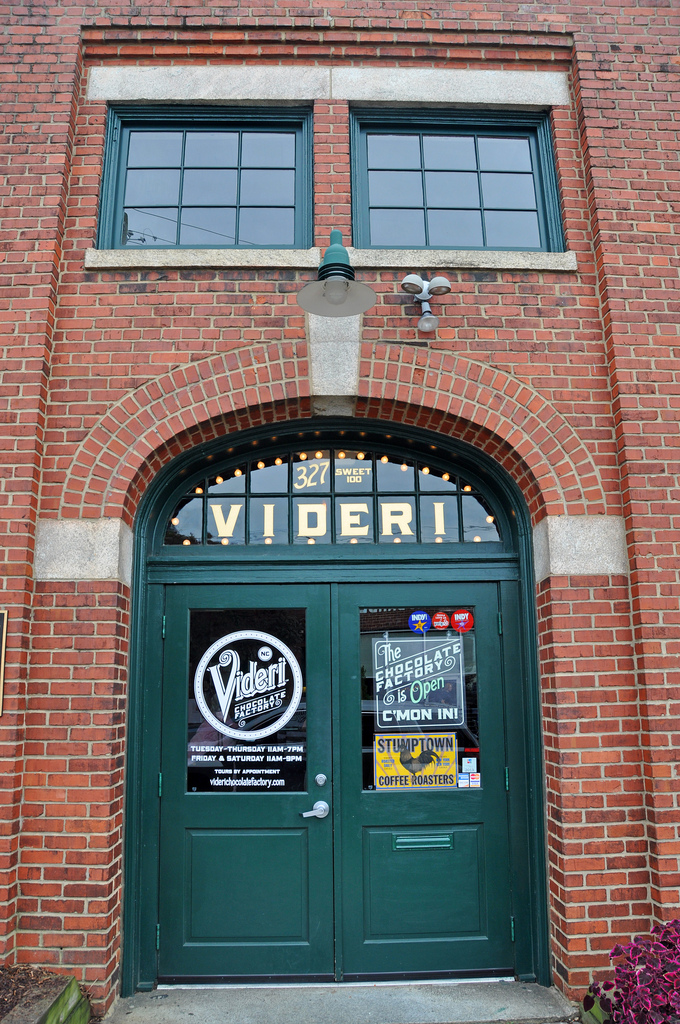
Videri Chocolate Factory

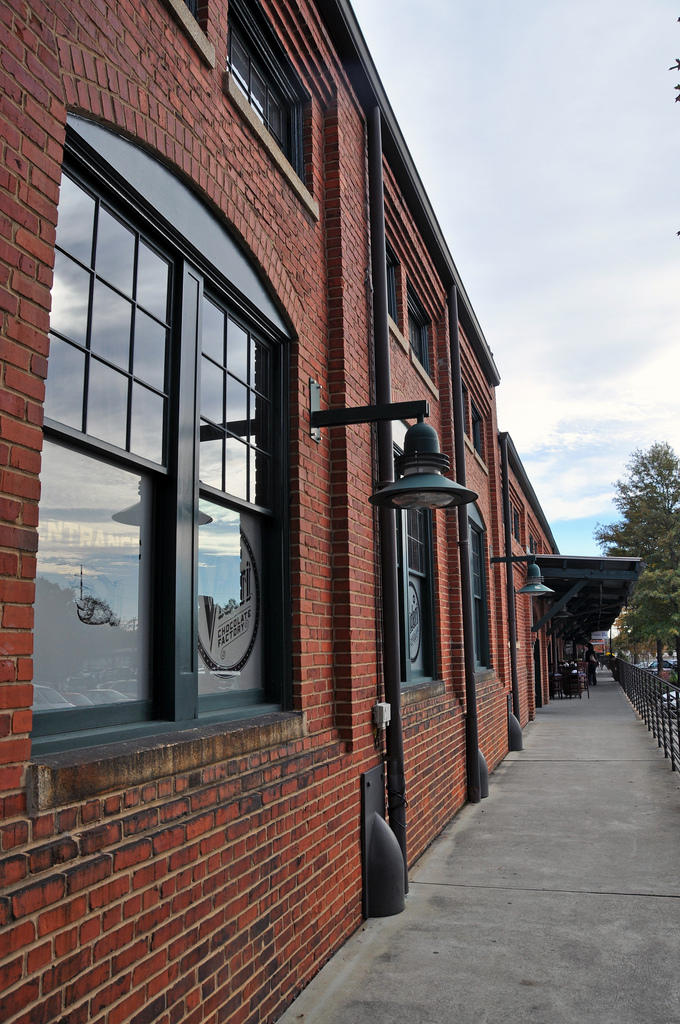
The Raleigh Depot

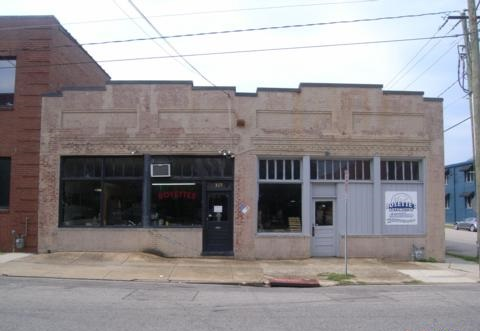
Boyette's Automotive Performance Machine Shop
