= 21c Museum Hotels =

Boutique hotel chain

- Industry: Hotel
- Founded: 2006; 20 years ago
- Founders: Laura Lee Brown; Steve Wilson
- Headquarters: Louisville, Kentucky, United States
- Number of locations: 9 hotels (2 under development)
- Area served: United States
- Parent: AccorHotels
- Website: http://www.21cmuseumhotels.com/

21c Museum Hotels is a contemporary art museum and boutique hotel chain based in Louisville, Kentucky. The chain also has locations in Lexington, Kentucky; Cincinnati, Ohio; Chicago, Illinois; Bentonville, Arkansas; Durham, North Carolina; and St. Louis, Missouri. Each of these seven properties comprises a boutique hotel, a contemporary art museum, and a restaurant. It was acquired by the French hotel group Accor in July 2018 for $51 million.

21c Museum Hotel was voted among the Top 10 Hotels in the World in the Condé Nast Traveler Readers' Choice Awards in 2009, 2010 and 2011. It was also voted as the #1 Hotel in the South in the 2012 Condé Nast Traveler Readers' Choice Awards.

21c Museum Hotel, Cincinnati was named the top hotel in the United States and the 11th in the world in 2013 by Condé Nast Traveler's annual reader survey.

== History ==
21c was launched in 2006 by philanthropists and art collectors Laura Lee Brown and Steve Wilson. They were inspired to create 21c after seeing farmland and rural landscapes developed while the historic buildings of Louisville's downtown sat vacantly. They created 21c in Louisville's downtown arts and theater district to support urban renewal and regional agriculture, and have developed partnerships with local growers to supply products and ingredients for the Proof on Main restaurant and bar.

Co-founder Craig Greenberg was named the company's president in 2012 and chief executive officer in September 2017. He stepped down from 21c in June 2020.

Following the success of the Louisville location, additional 21c locations were opened, with seven currently in operation and another in the planning stages.

After 21c was acquired by Accor, Brown and Wilson maintained a 15% stake. They continued to be involved with the company.

In 2023, the Oklahoma City and Nashville locations were both rebranded under new owners. OKC becoming the Hyatt's Fordson and Nashville becoming The Bankers Alley Hotel Nashville, Tapestry Collection by Hilton.

== 21c Museum ==
The museum is open twenty-four hours a day, seven days a week. It is free to visit. More than twenty special exhibitions and installations have been organized by the 21c Museum since its opening in 2006.

Recent exhibitions include:

- Creating Identity: Portraiture Today
- All's Fair in Art and War: Envisioning Conflict
- Tangled Up In You: Connecting, Coexisting, and Conceiving Identity
- Hybridity: The Evolution of Species and Spaces in 21st-Century Art

21c Museum has presented projects by Mikhail Baryshnikov and John Waters, as well as traveling exhibitions including "Marc Swanson: Beginning to See the Light", organized by the Santa Barbara Contemporary Arts Forum, and "Constant World: the Work of Jennifer and Kevin McCoy", organized by Beall Center for Art and Technology.

=== Artworks ===
The 21c Museum features permanent installations and special exhibitions of works by artists, including Bill Viola, Tony Oursler, Andres Serrano, Sam Taylor-Wood, David Levinthal, Yyinka Shonibare, Judy Fox, Chuck Close, Alfredo Jaar, David Herbert, Daan Roosegaarde, Anastasia Schipani, Kara Walker, and Serkan Özkaya.

The museum also displays several original site-specific commissions, including:

- Uros by Grimanesa Amorós (2012)
- Untitled by Werner Reiterer, the artist's first permanent public sculpture in the United States (2006)
- In the Absence of Voyeurism 6 & 7 by artist and surgeon Sean Bidic (2000–2006)
- "Cloud Rings by MacArthur Fellow Ned Kahn (2006)
- Red Penguin by Cracking Art Group (2005)
- Arilated: The 21c Pip Mobile by Monica Mahoney (2005–2007)
- Text Rain by Camille Utterback and Romy Achituv (1999)
- Sculptures from the Satyrs Daughters, 1999 series and Figure 2004 series by Judy Fox
- Flow 5.0 by Daan Roosegaarde (2013)
- Echo by Heather Gordon and Justin Tornow (2017)

== Locations ==
=== Louisville, Kentucky ===
In its Louisville location, 21c renovated five 19th-century warehouse buildings listed on the National Register of Historic Places to house the museum, hotel, and restaurant. It is located within the city's arts and theater district along "Museum Row", which is home to the Louisville Slugger Museum, the Muhammad Ali Center, the Frazier History Museum, the Kentucky Museum of Art and Craft, and the Kentucky Science Center. This location has a restaurant called Proof on Main, which was named one of the "Best New Restaurants of 2006" by Esquire magazine. The menu features ingredients from local farms and food purveyors, as well as 50 types of bourbon. Located outside the establishment stands "The Statue of David", a double-size, golden replica of Michelangelo's David, created by Turkish artist Serkan Özkaya. Originally a project for the Istanbul Biennial art exhibition, the statue collapsed under its weight. Özkaya salvaged and restored the statue and created two more casts, one of which was acquired by 21c Museum Hotels.

Deborah Berke & Partners Architects designed the facility, for which they won the American Institute of Architects Kentucky Honor Award in 2011, the AIA NYS Excellence for Historic Preservation/Adaptive Reuse in 2007, and the Best of Year Award for Hospitality Design, Interior Design Magazine, in 2006. The hotel was also inducted into Historic Hotels of America, the official program of the National Trust for Historic Preservation.

=== Cincinnati, Ohio ===
In its Cincinnati location, 21c undertook the complete renovation of the historic Hotel Metropole, a building previously used for housing low-income residents. It cost $48 million to renovate the hotel. In 2025, the hotel was released by 21c.

=== Bentonville, Arkansas ===
The third location opened in Bentonville in 2013. The hotel is located on land that was once a cornfield outside the urban center of Bentonville. The Bentonville location was named one of the top 15 hotels in the US by the Travel + Leisure Magazine in 2017.

=== Durham, North Carolina ===
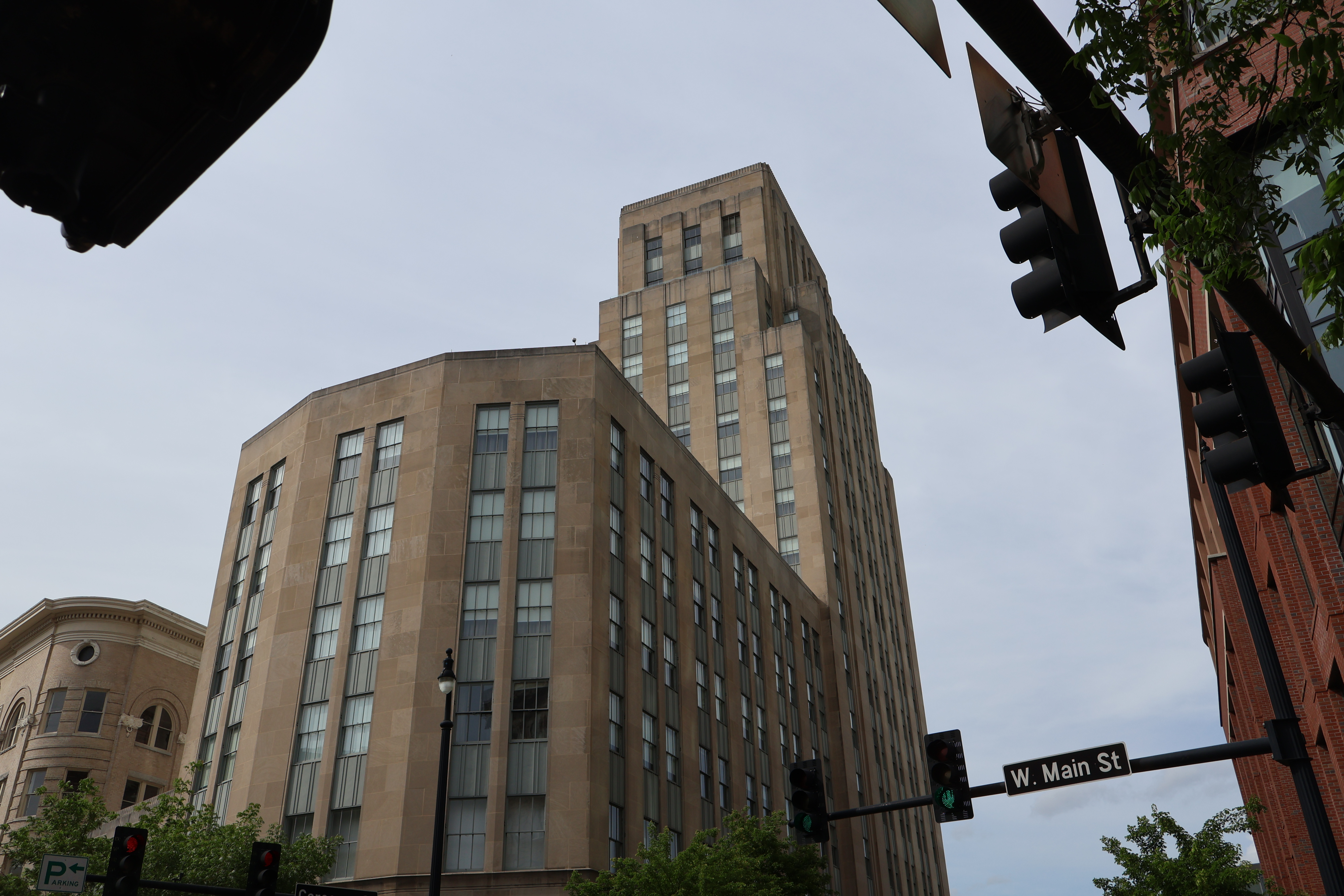
Durham, April 2023

In March 2015, 21c opened its fourth hotel in Durham, North Carolina. In 2013, the company bought the historic Hill Building for $5.25 million. With an investment of $48 million, the Hill Building was renovated and converted into a hotel with 125 rooms. The hotel is centrally located in Downtown Durham and is a short walk from the Durham Bulls Stadium, the DPAC, and the Carolina Theater.

=== Lexington, Kentucky ===
In February 2016, the Lexington hotel opened in the Fayette National Bank Building.

=== Chicago, Illinois ===
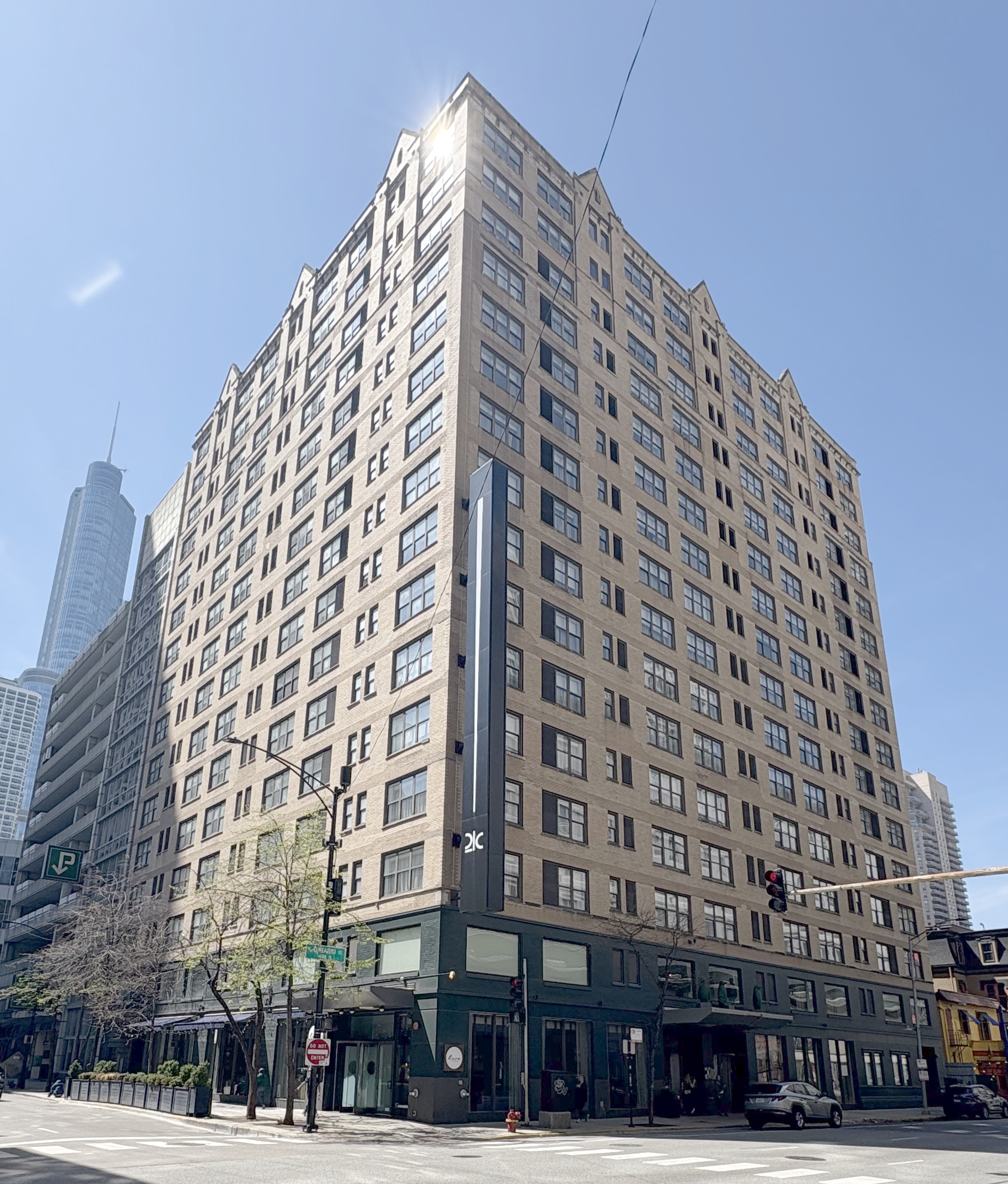
Chicago, April 2025

In February 2020, 21c opened a hotel in Chicago, Illinois, renovating The James Hotel in Chicago's River North Gallery District with 297 rooms and over 10,000 square feet of exhibition and meeting space. In 2025, the hotel was released by 21c.

=== St. Louis, Missouri ===
In August 2023, the group opened their 173-room boutique hotel and art museum located in the Downtown West district of St. Louis.

=== Oklahoma City, Oklahoma ===
In June 2016, 21c opened a hotel in Oklahoma City, Oklahoma in the Fred Jones Assembly Plant. The plant was built in 1915 and was known for being where the Ford Model T was assembled. In 2023, the location was released by 21c and became the Hyatt's Fordson.

=== Nashville, Tennessee ===
In May 2017, the Nashville hotel opened in the historic Gray & Dudley building in downtown. In 2023 the location was released by 21c and became The Bankers Alley Hotel Nashville, Tapestry Collection by Hilton.

=== Kansas City, Missouri ===
In July 2018, the group opened their 120 suite and gallery hotel in Kansas City, Missouri, inside the historic Savoy Hotel and Grill. In 2025 the location was released by 21c and became The Hotel Savoy, Tapestry Collection by Hilton.

=== Further developments ===
An additional property location in Pittsburgh is in active development in 2024. The future of another planned location in Des Moines, Iowa is unclear now that "The Fifth" project, of which it was due to be a part, has stalled.

The company had been looking to open a hotel in Indianapolis in the old city hall, with construction scheduled to begin in 2017; however, these plans were scrapped at the end of March 2017 due to problems with financing.

== Restaurants ==
Each 21c location has an onsite restaurant, with many receiving recognition and awards, including multiple James Beard Foundation Award finalists for excellence in cuisine.

Each restaurant reflects the local flavor and cuisine of its home city. The current lineup includes:

- The Hive - Bentonville
- Metropole - Cincinnati
- Counting House - Durham
- Lockbox - Lexington
- Proof on Main - Louisville
- Lure Fishbar - Chicago
- Idol Wolf - St. Louis
