= Providence High School (North Carolina) =

American public school in North Carolina

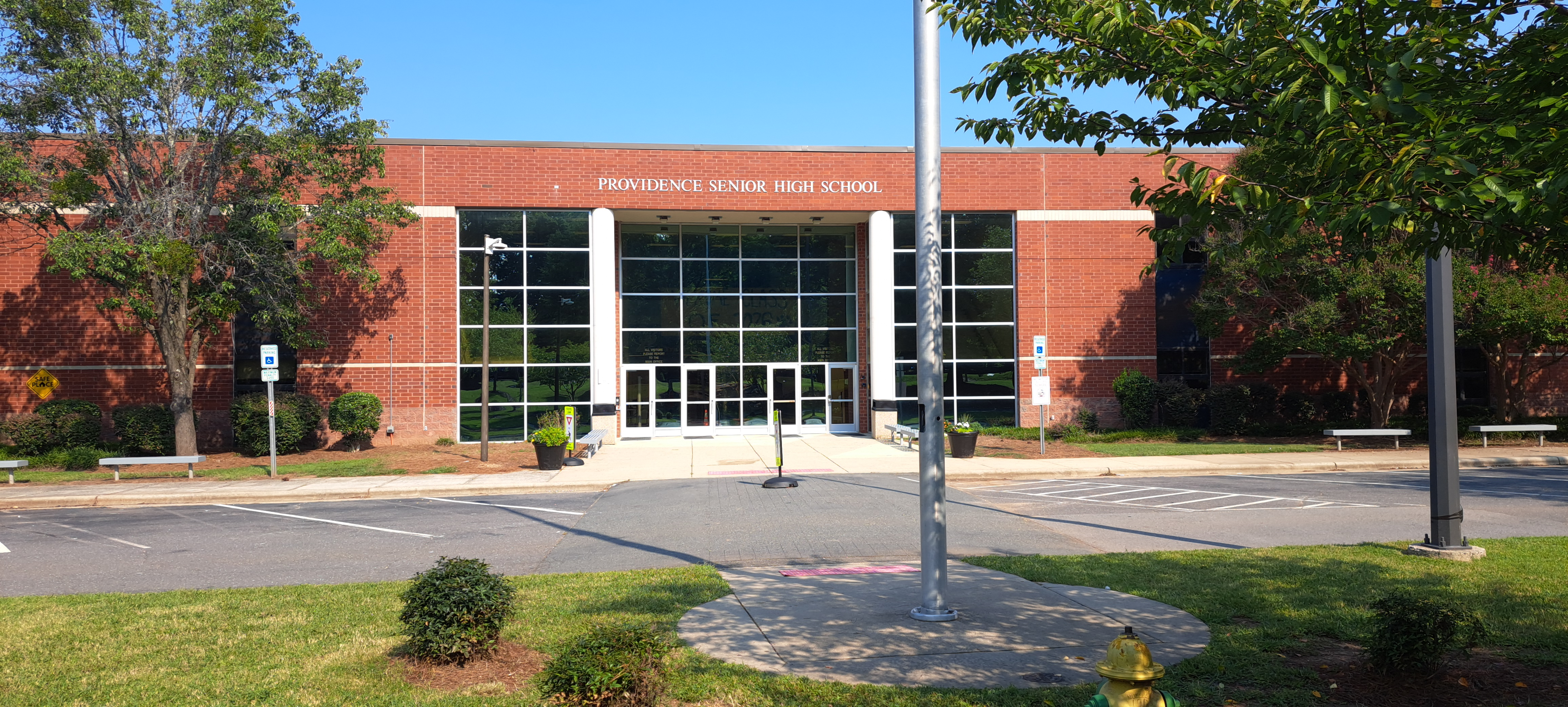
- Providence High School, September 2022

Location
- 1800 Pineville-Matthews Road; Charlotte, North Carolina 28270; United States; 35°06′44″N 80°45′54″W

Information
- Type: Public
- Established: 1989 (37 years ago)
- School district: Charlotte Mecklenburg Schools
- CEEB code: 340688
- Principal: Chris Myers (2026-present)
- Teaching staff: 105.41 (FTE)
- Grades: 9–12
- Enrollment: 2,167 (2024-2025)
- Student to teacher ratio: 20.56
- Campus: Suburban
- Colors: Black, white, and Vegas gold
- Athletics: NCHSAA 8A
- Athletics conference: Southwestern 7A/8A
- Nickname: Panthers
- Rival: Ardrey Kell High School
- Website: providencehs.cmsk12.org

Providence High School is a public high school located off of Pineville-Matthews Road in Charlotte, North Carolina, in suburban South Charlotte. Providence serves southern and southeastern Mecklenburg County and is a part of the Charlotte-Mecklenburg School District.

Its boundary includes a portion of Matthews.

== Amenities ==
- Main building
- Technical building
- Greenhouse
- Auditorium
- Gym
- Swimming pool
- Football stadium
- Baseball stadium
- Practice fields
- Tennis courts
- Softball field
- Outdoor track facilities

== AP classes ==
The school offers Advanced Placement.

== Awards ==
- 1992, 1993, 1997, 2004: North Carolina Wachovia Cup for best overall athletic program in North Carolina
- 1996: Blue Ribbon "School of Excellence"
- 2002–03, 2003–04, 2004–05: North Carolina "School of Distinction"
- 2007–08, 2008–09, 2009–10: North Carolina "Honor School of Excellence"

== Athletics ==
Providence High School is a member of the North Carolina High School Athletic Association (NCHSAA) and is classified as an 8A school. It is a part of the Southwestern 7A/8A Conference. Before the NCHSAA expanded from 4 to 8 classes, the school was classified as a 4A school (North Carolina's former highest classification for high school athletics). Its mascot is the panther, and its colors are black, vegas gold, and white.

In 2001, the Providence Panthers women’s soccer team won the North Carolina 4A state championship game against Broughton, with a win of 2-1.

In 2007, the Providence Panthers men's tennis team won the North Carolina 4A dual team state championship, and posted a perfect 17–0 season.

In 2015, the Providence Panthers men's varsity baseball team won the North Carolina 4A state championship against Millbrook, with a win of 10–2.

In 2016, the Providence Panthers women's varsity soccer team won the North Carolina 4A state championship game 2–1, against Apex Middle Creek.

In 2022, the Providence Panthers men's varsity baseball team went undefeated and won the North Carolina 4A state championship.

In 2024, the Providence Panthers women's varsity tennis team won the North Carolina 4A dual team state championship for the first time, ending the title drought for 35 years and posted a 20-1 seasonal record.

== Notable alumni ==
- Ty Buttrey, MLB pitcher
- Brian Edwards, former professional soccer goalkeeper
- Logan Davidson, MLB infielder
- Ashley Fliehr, professional wrestler; multi-time WWE Women's Champion under the ring name Charlotte Flair; daughter of Ric Flair
- Reid Fliehr, former professional wrestler, son of Ric Flair
- Michael Forret, MLB pitcher
- Mark Freiburger, American filmmaker
- Antawn Jamison, UNC basketball alumnus, 2x NBA All-Star in 2005 and 2008
- Impa Kasanganay, mixed martial artist
- Brock Lunde, professional wrestler; son of Arn Anderson
- Ken McCool, member-elect of the North Carolina House of Representatives from the 105th district
- Austin Proehl, NFL wide receiver
- Kevin Shackelford, MLB pitcher
- Richie Shaffer, MLB third baseman, first round draft pick in the 2012 Major League Baseball draft by the Tampa Bay Rays
- Jilen Siroky, swimmer who represented the United States at the 1996 Summer Olympics
- Jessica Stroup, actress and model, most notably of 90210
- Justin Tornow, dancer and choreographer
- Paul Waggoner, guitarist for progressive metal band Between the Buried and Me
