= Heather Gordon =

American visual artist

- Born: 1967 (age 58–59)
- Education: University of Florida; New Mexico State University
- Occupation: Visual artist
- Children: 1

Heather Gordon (born 1967) is an American contemporary visual artist.

== Career ==
Gordon creates large-scale paintings and immersive art projects, using numbers, algorithms, and geometry in her creative process.

In November 2017 Gordon's installation And Then the Sun Swallowed Me was exhibited at the Contemporary Art Museum of Raleigh.

Her piece Cinnabar was featured in the North Carolina Museum of Art's exhibit titled You Are Here: Light, Color, and Sound Experiences from April 7, 2018, until July 2, 2018. Prior to the exhibit, her work was featured as part of the museum's Matrons of the Arts initiative, highlighting female-identified artists from around the world. She received a North Carolina Artists Fellowship in 2014.

Her collaborate works with dancer and choreographer Justin Tornow, titled Echo and SHOW, were shown at 21c Durham Museum Hotel and The Durham Fruit. In 2017 Gordon and Tornow collaborated to create No.19/Modulations, which was shown at the CCB Plaza in downtown Durham, North Carolina.

In August 2018 her work titled DOUBLE EDGED: Geometric Abstraction Then and Now was shown at the Weatherspoon Art Museum. Also in 2018, she debuted Steel, a tape installation, at The Dillon in Raleigh, North Carolina.

Her work has also been shown at the Ackland Art Museum, Waterworks, The Carrack Modern Art Museum, and the North Carolina School of Science and Math. She is part of Mural Durham, an art project in Durham.

In 2019 Gordon worked with the David M Rubenstein Rare Book & Manuscript Library and the Duke University Archives to research documents related to the Duke Forest for her work titled Forest for the Trees.

== Personal life ==
Gordon was the only child of an accountant and engineer. Her father was a United States Air Force officer, and grew up primarily on military bases around the United States. Gordon is lesbian, and said she knew when she was eight years old.

Gordon earned a Bachelor of Fine Arts degree from the University of Florida in 1990 and a Master of Fine Arts degree from New Mexico State University in 1995. She lives in Durham. Gordon has a son named Henry.
