= Pasta by Design =

Book about the various forms of pasta

- Author: George L. Legendre
- Illustrator: Photography by Stefano Graziani
- Language: English
- Publisher: Thames & Hudson
- Publication date: November 2011
- ISBN: 978-0-500-51580-8

Pasta by Design is a book by George L. Legendre, with a foreword by Paola Antonelli, and photography by Stefano Graziani. It is based on an idea by Marco Guarnieri.

== Overview ==
Pasta by Design spans the fields of architecture, food, and popular science. The book features 92 pasta shapes, each depicted by a photograph, a mathematical equation, a 3D visual, and a short paragraph on geographic provenance and cooking etiquette. It was first published in 2011 by Thames & Hudson, while a German translation was published in 2012 by Springer Verlag.

== Taxonomy ==
Pasta by Design is primarily a work of taxonomy, or classification. The critical inventory of shapes recalls the compilations of building-related knowledge known in the nineteenth century as architectural treatises, in which the source material was systematically drawn and formatted as a catalogue. To organise and classify the large variety of pasta shapes, the book employed principles of phylogenetics. The first application of phylogenetics to architectural criticism appeared in Phylogenesis: FOA’s Ark (2003), an architectural monograph by Foreign Office Architects, the first such publication to catalogue projects exclusively by design property, instead of the commonly used markers of programme, location, and client. Pasta by Design opens with a phylogenetic chart and uses it to classify 92 pasta shapes. Unlike FOA’s Ark its criteria of classification are couched in analytic mathematics.

== Morphology ==
The organizing principle of classification is the morphology of each pasta shape, reduced to its elemental characteristics and expressed by simple mathematical relationships. Shapes which may look dissimilar at first glance, such as Sagne Incannulate and Cappelletti, may still be described with the same mathematical relationships and hence may turn out to be more closely related than is immediately apparent. Technically, each shape is depicted by three parametric equations of two mathematical functions, the sine and cosine of two angles. Parametric equations can describe any three-dimensional form. The mathematics of the book are neither exclusive to the modelling of pasta, nor innovative in a technical sense.

== Design, science, and culture ==
Pasta by Design reflects the recent anointment of pasta as the subject of theoretical and historical investigations, its embrace by the public as both foodstuff and design icon, and the prominence of food in society and culture at large. It is also indicative of a broader, post-millennium cultural trend summarised by design curator Paola Antonelli in those words: In our contemporary world (...) where programmers talk about the beauty of code and architects and designers tinker with algorithms and software to achieve organic formal and structural behaviours, seeing mathematics in fusilli makes perfect sense. The application of geometry and phylogenetics to design and illustration is symptomatic of the wholesale identification of many creatives with the ambitions of mathematicians, biologists and scientists at large. This cultural trend is in evidence in architecture’s decade-long pursuit of morphogenetics, the mathematical and biomorphic modelling of form. In the design arts, it is the subject of MoMA’s Design and the Elastic Mind (2008), a curatorial exploration of the designers’ ability to grasp momentous changes in technology, science, and social mores. In the field of cookery, it is found (among other places) in Nathan Myhrvold's Modernist Cuisine: The Art and Science of Cooking (2011) and the rise of molecular gastronomy.
