= White Rabbit Books & Things =

LGBTQ bookstore in Raleigh, North Carolina

- Type: bookstore
- Founded: 1991
- Founder: John Neal
- Defunct: 2010
- Headquarters: 309 W Martin Street, Raleigh, North Carolina, United States

White Rabbit Books & Things is the name of three LGBTQ bookstores in North Carolina that were owned by John Neal. The first store was located in Greensboro, the second in Raleigh, and the third in Charlotte.

== History ==
The store was originally owned by John Neal, who previously ran a mail-order calligraphy supply business in Greensboro with an added gay-themed book section, which became the first store.

The White Rabbit in Raleigh opened as the second store in 1991, in the former Paper Plant bookstore on West Martin Street in city's Warehouse District. Neal hired Jim Baxter as the store's manager. Baxter was the publisher of The Front-Page Newspaper, an LGBTQ community newspaper started started in 1976, and continued to publish the paper from White Rabbit until its last press in 2006. Later, Chris Newlin was hired as the manager. The Raleigh store closed in 2010.

A third location was opened in Charlotte.

The White Rabbit sold LGBTQ books, including Is It a Choice? and Who Cares If It’s a Choice?, as well as Pride flags, rainbow stickers, rainbow candles, greeting cards, underwear, T-shirts, dance music CDs, and DVDs for rent.

In the 2000s, the bookstore chain was purchased by the owner of Q-Notes.

A circa 1970s mural was discovered in the building's storage room.
