= Savoy Hotel and Grill =

- U.S. National Register of Historic Places
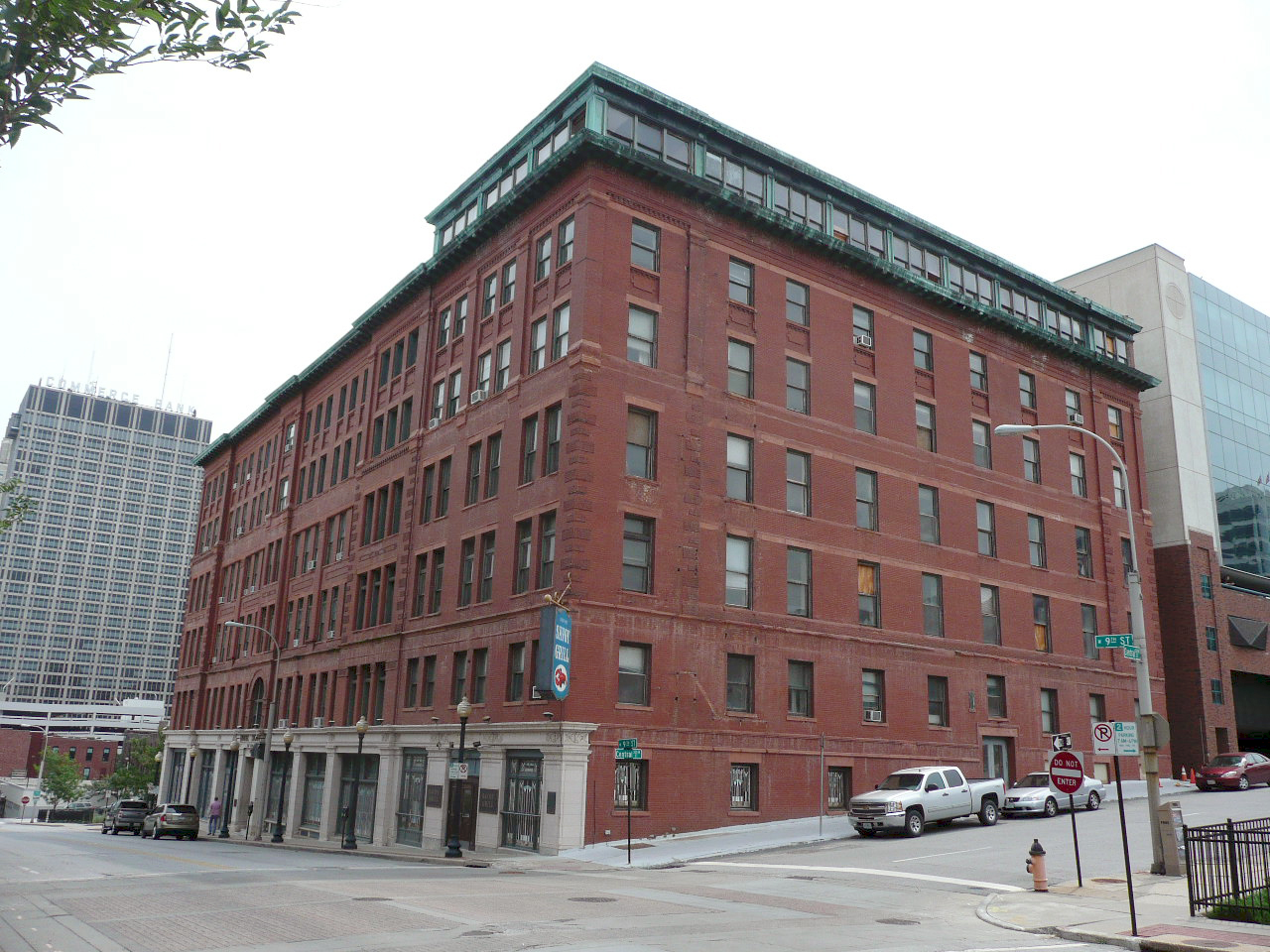

- Location within Missouri Location within the United States
- Location: 219 W. 9th St. and 9th and Central Sts., Kansas City, Missouri
- Coordinates: 39°6′13″N 94°35′12″W
- Area: 9.9 acres (4.0 ha)
- Built: 1888
- Architect: Van Brunt & Howe
- Architectural style: Art Nouveau
- Website: thesavoykc.com
- NRHP reference No.: 74001073
- Added to NRHP: December 30, 1974

The Savoy Hotel and Grill is a historic hotel and restaurant in Kansas City, Missouri. It was the oldest continuously operating hotel in the United States west of the Mississippi River until it closed for renovations in 2016. It was listed on the National Register of Historic Places in 1974.

== History ==
The structure was built in 1888 by the owners of the Arbuckle Coffee Company and opened in 1889 as the Hotel Thorne. It was renamed the Hotel Savoy in 1894. In 1903, the hotel was remodeled and the west wing was added, featuring the Savoy Grill dining room. The Savoy Grill was the oldest continuously operating restaurant in Kansas City, Missouri, until it closed with the hotel for renovations in 2016.

In the early 1900s, the Savoy was a luxury destination for travelers arriving by train in Kansas City. It was the first hotel seen by travelers as they entered the city from the old Union Depot. With the depression of the 1930s and the later shift toward suburban living, the hotel began to fall into disrepair, although the restaurant remained active. The Savoy was listed on the National Register of Historic Places on December 30, 1974., and renovation of the hotel into a bed and breakfast began in 1985. The renovation project was undertaken by owner Don Lee. Lee had purchased the Savoy Grill in 1960 and the entire Savoy Hotel in 1965. During the renovation, care was taken to preserve original pieces of the hotel that were still in usable condition, including the original reception desk and stained glass artwork. The Savoy Grill included the original carved oak bar, high beamed ceilings, murals painted in 1903 by Edward Holslag, and the famous Booth No. 4, which was frequented by Harry and Bess Truman.

The hotel closed in 2016 for extensive renovations costing $50 million and reopened in 2018 as the 21c Museum Hotel, a part of a hotel chain themed around contemporary art.

The hotel was sold in January 2025 and the art theming was abandoned. Avion Hospitality assumed management and the hotel was restored to its historic name as Hotel Savoy Kansas City, Tapestry Collection by Hilton.

== Savoy Grill ==
The Savoy Grill, located at 9th and Central, was a longstanding Kansas City, Missouri fine dining establishment that was founded in 1903 and gained historic landmark with the National Register of Historic Places in 1974. Many notable figures have visited the restaurant including Harry S. Truman who made frequent visits over his lunch hour when he was the owner/operator of a downtown haberdashery. Booth No. 4, known as the presidents' booth, has been host to Warren Harding, Harry S. Truman, Gerald Ford, and Ronald Reagan. During prohibition, rather than remove the bar, drapes were hung up to conceal its presence. The Grill was most famous for its seafood and steaks.

Its slogan in the 1960s and 1970s was: "The Savoy Grill: A new, different, and exciting restaurant over sixty years old".

The Savoy Grill closed in 2016. The hotel and restaurant remained closed until 2018 while new owners refurbished them. The restaurant was reopened as Savoy at 21c. The newly renovated hotel then joined Historic Hotels of America, a program of the National Trust for Historic Preservation, in 2019, and it remains a member in 2022.

== Murals ==
"The original Grill Room was surrounded by The Savoy Murals, painted by Edward Holslag in 1903 when he was in his early thirties. Those murals depict the pioneers' departure from Westport Landing and their journey along the Santa Fe Trail. Holslag, who was a pupil of The National Academy of Design and John LaFarge, is represented at the Congressional Library in Washington, D.C. The Savoy Murals have been included in the Smithsonian Institution's "Bicentennial Inventory of American Paintings." ". The Savoy at 21C now has the murals surrounding the bar.

== Fire ==
On October 23, 2014 a major fire destroyed the kitchen of the Savoy Grill. The historic restaurant area was not destroyed but sustained significant smoke damage. The fire was caused by a cook who was not paying attention. The restaurant was closed down and the hotel was evacuated.
