= White Rabbit Radio =

Far-right online radio station

- United States

Programming
- Language: English

Ownership
- Owner: Timothy Gallaher Murdock

History
- Founded: 2000s

Links
- Website: whiterabbitradio.net

White Rabbit Radio is a far-right and white nationalist online radio station hosted by Timothy Gallaher Murdock, known by the pseudonym Horus the Avenger. The program promotes white purity, the white genocide conspiracy theory and racist terminology.

President of the United States Donald Trump's views on the South African farm attacks have received praise on the program.
