= AOF =

AOF, AoF, Aof, or aof may refer to:

== Arts and media ==
- Action On Film International Film Festival, founded in 2004, initially in California; in 2017, moved to Nevada

=== Music ===
- Alexisonfire, a Canadian post-hardcore band
- The Art of Fugue (BWV 1080), a work by Johann Sebastian Bach
- Articles of Faith (band), a hardcore punk band from Chicago
- Supanat Chalermchaichareonkij (Thai: ศุภณัฐ เฉลิมชัยเจริญกิจ; born 1986), nicknamed "Aof", a Thai singer and actor

=== Video games ===
- Art of Fighting, a competitive fighting series produced by SNK (now known as SNK Playmore)
- ATV Offroad Fury, an offroad racing series

== Science, technology, and mathematics ==
- Adsorbable organic fluorine, an analytical testing method for PFAS
- Aggregate objective function, a single functional to combine all of the objectives in multi-objective optimization
- Append-only file, a software technique of logging database updates for persistence, such as in Redis
- Absolute open flow, in oil and gas exploration and production
- Adaptive Optics Facility, including a laser guide star, at the Very Large Telescope's UT4, Yepun

== Education/academia ==
- Academy of Finance, the finance-based high school education program sponsored by the National Academy Foundation
- Altorientalische Forschungen (AoF), a German academic journal for ancient Near East studies
- Avon Old Farms School, an all-boys boarding high school in Avon, CT

== Organizations ==
- American Osteopathic Foundation, the philanthropic arm of the American Osteopathic Association
- Ancient Order of Foresters, now known as the Foresters Friendly Society
- Ancient Order of Freesmiths, a secret society with roots in Medieval Germany
- Atheists of Florida, a non-profit organisation in Florida, US
- Australian Olympic Federation, now known as the Australian Olympic Committee
- Athlitikos Omilos Freattydas Porfyras (AOF Porfyras; Greek: Αθλητικός Όμιλος Φρεαττύδας Πορφύρας), a Greek multisport club based in Freattyda residential area, Piraeus city, Athens urban area, Attica region, Greece
- 2 members of SOLIDAR, a European network of social justice NGOs:
  - Arbejdernes Oplysningsforbund, Denmark
  - Arbeidernes Opplysningsforbund (Studieforbundet AOF), Norway
- Atair Pty Ltd. (ICAO: AOF), South Africa — see List of airline codes or List of airline codes (A)

== Places ==
- Afrique Occidentale Française (French West Africa; Spanish: África Occidental Francesa), a former grouping of French colonies, listed in Compendium of postage stamp issuers (Al–Aq)
- Alba oil field (UN/LOCODE: GB AOF), in the Moray Firth, North Sea, UK
- Homer Glen, Illinois (UN/LOCODE: US AOF)

== Other uses ==
- Agricultural Outlook Forum, a United States Department of Agriculture (USDA) program — see Deja Perkins § Education and academic career, Linda Black Elk, Mt. Olive Pickle Company § References, files pages such as File:Chesapeake Bay Foundation Clagett Farm Manager Michael Heller, on tractor, welcomes U S Department of Agriculture (USDA) Agricultural Outlook Forum (AOF) Farm Conservation Tour participants, and gives them an (20180221-OCE-LSC-9001).jpg
- Admiral of the fleet
- Bragat language (ISO 639-3: aof, Glottolog: brag1240) of Papua New Guinea, in the Palei branch of the Torricelli family
- Article of Focus, e.g. Wikipedia:WikiProject Slipknot/AoF, Wikipedia:WikiProject Psychopathic Records/AoF, Wikipedia:WikiProject Korn/AoF

== Further disambiguation ==
- Academy of Florence (disambiguation)
- Act of Faith (disambiguation)
- Afternoon of a Faun (disambiguation)
- Agnes of France (disambiguation)
- Archbishop of Finland (disambiguation)
- Articles of Faith (disambiguation)
- Articles of Federation (disambiguation)
- Art of Fighting (disambiguation)
- AOTF (disambiguation)
- ASOIF (disambiguation)
