= Afternoon of a Faun =

L'après-midi d'un faune (or The Afternoon of a Faun) may refer to:

- L'après-midi d'un faune (poem) by Stéphane Mallarmé, published in 1876
  - Prélude à l'après-midi d'un faune (Prelude to the Afternoon of a Faun), 1894 composition by Claude Debussy, inspired by Mallarmé's poem
  - Afternoon of a Faun (Nijinsky), 1912 ballet by Vaslav Nijinsky, which uses Debussy's music and was also inspired by Mallarmé
  - L'Après-Midi d'un Faune, 1919 poem by William Faulkner, his first published work (William Faulkner bibliography)
  - Afternoon of a Faun (Robbins), 1953 ballet by Jerome Robbins to Debussy's music
  - Afternoon of a Faun (Rushton), 2006 ballet by Tim Rushton to Debussy's music created for Johan Kobborg
- Afternoon of a Faun: Tanaquil Le Clercq, 2013 American documentary by Nancy Buirski
- Afternoon of a Faun, a 2019 novel by James Lasdun
