= Afternoon of a Faun (Robbins) =

Ballet by Jerome Robbins

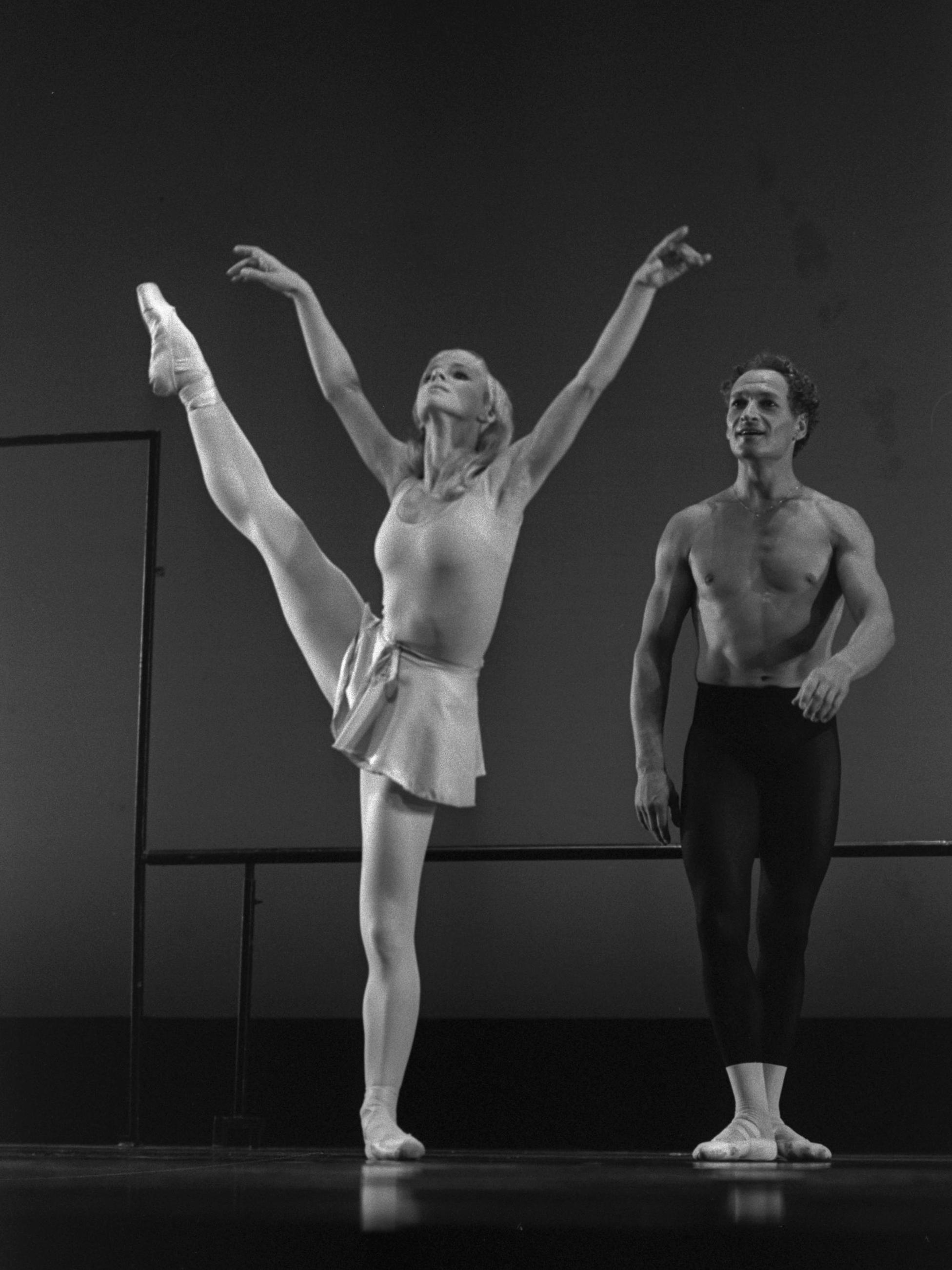
- Valery and Galina Panov in Afternoon of a Faun in 1977
- Choreographer: Jerome Robbins
- Music: Claude Debussy
- Premiere: 14 May 1953; City Center of Music and Drama
- Original ballet company: New York City Ballet
- Design: Irene Sharaff; Jean Rosenthal
- Created for: Tanaquil Le Clercq; Francisco Moncion
- Genre: Neoclassical ballet

Afternoon of a Faun is a neoclassical ballet choreographed by Jerome Robbins to Claude Debussy's Prélude à l'après-midi d'un faune. The ballet features two young dancers meeting at a rehearsal studio. Robbins was influenced by Stéphane Mallarmé's poem L'après-midi d'un faune, the inspiration for Debussy's score, as well as Vaslav Nijinsky's 1912 ballet to the same score, and his own observation of dancers.

The ballet was made for the New York City Ballet, and premiered on May 14, 1953, at the City Center of Music and Drama, with the two roles of the ballet originated by Tanaquil Le Clercq and Francisco Moncion. Afternoon of a Faun has since been performed by various other ballet companies.

== Background and development ==
Claude Debussy's Prélude à l'après-midi d'un faune was inspired by Stéphane Mallarmé's poem L'après-midi d'un faune, about a faun's encounter with nymphs. The first ballet set to the score was choreographed by Vaslav Nijinsky and premiered in 1912. This ballet was scandalous due to its overtly sexual nature. Kasyan Goleizovsky and Serge Lifar made versions of the ballet in 1922 and 1935 respectively. In 1940, Jerome Robbins made a parody of the Nijinsky ballet, titled PM of a Faun. In 1948, Robbins joined the New York City Ballet soon after it was founded, as both a dancer and choreographer.

For New York City Ballet's 1953 season, Robbins decided to choreograph to the Debussy score. Robbins explained that he was inspired by various factors, including his fascination with the Nijinsky ballet. He was inspired by watching Edward Villella, then a seventeen-year-old student at the School of American Ballet, in a ballet class, who "suddenly began to stretch his body in a very odd way, almost like he was trying to get something out of it. And I thought how animalistic it was... he didn't know what he was doing, and that sort of stuck in my head." Another source of inspiration was watching Louis Johnson, a young black dancer, and a female student rehearsing the adagio from Swan Lake while watching themselves in the mirror, and as Robbins described, he "was struck by the way they were watching that couple over there doing a love dance and totally unaware of the proximity and possible sexuality of their physical encounter." Robbins also read a translation of Mallarmé's poem.

Robbins decided to set the ballet in a dance studio, rather than a Greek setting like the Nijinsky ballet. He removed the nymph attendants, and instead have two young dancers meeting in the studio. Tanaquil Le Clercq was Robbins' first choice for portraying the female role. When Robbins began working on the ballet, Le Clercq was still on her honeymoon. Robbins original choice for the male role was Buzz Miller, who was not a member of the company. However, miscommunication between Miller and company co-founder George Balanchine prevented him from appearing as a guest artist. Robbins also considered Johnson, who attended the School of American Ballet, and had previously danced in Robbins' Ballade as a guest artist. He had one rehearsal with Le Clercq but was not cast. In their respective biographies on Robbins, authors Deborah Jowitt and Greg Lawrence both speculated that it was due to the all-white New York City Ballet's reservation about having an interracial couple performing a romantic pas de deux. Johnson later stated that he believed it was Balanchine who rejected his casting, because the role would have led to him joining the company permanently. Jowitt also noted that perhaps Robbins was just experimenting with Johnson. Robbins ultimately chose the Dominican-born Francisco Moncion, for his "animal" quality.

Robbins was unsure whether the mirror of the dance studio should be straight front, where the audience would be at, or at the side, right-angled to the audience. He made both versions, and chose to use the straight front version. He explained, "When the dancers' attention is to the side, it's easier for the audience to watch - they are sort of looking in - but when it's straight front, I think something more arresting happens." Le Clercq recalled that Robbins completed the ballet quicker than his other works she was familiar with. She also said that she was given very few acting notes from Robbins. The costumes were designed by Irene Sharaff, with the woman in a practice tunic and the man in tights and bare-chested. The set and lighting was by Jean Rosenthal. Robbins showed Rosenthal a drawing of dancers in a studio by Paul Cadmus. She then conceived the idea of using white silk as the wall. Instead of the French title used in both the poem and the score, Robbins gave the ballet a stripped-down English title, Afternoon of a Faun.

== Choreography and interpretation ==
The ballet is set on a summer day, in a dance studio. The man lies asleep on the floor, before a woman enters and starts warming up at the barre. The two then start dancing together, while looking at themselves in the mirror, which is in fact the audience. At the end of the ballet, the man kisses the woman on her cheek. She then leaves, while he returns to his sleep.

Author Amanda Vaill wrote that the ballet is "deliberately devoid of flashy steps or complicated lifts; spare and poetic'. Moncion noted that the choreography referenced the poem, "the gestures he used were evocative of Mallarmé's faun - such as pushing through the reeds on a hot humid afternoon." Le Clercq noted that many of her natural gestures were incorporated to the choreography.

Author Nancy Reynolds noted that different ballerinas interpret the role differently, some "do it very literally, very realistically" and some "are totally, eerily removed." Le Clercq stated that her interpretation "was removed." Robbins said of the woman, "I always thought the girl had just washed her hair and just had on new toe shoes and a new clean practice dress and came into the studio to preen and practice. Moncion noted that Le Clercq's version of the character "was never innocent", while some later interpretations are. While the ballet had also been interpreted as a commentary on dancers' narcissism, Robbins was resistant with this idea as "The mirror is the dancers' work tool." Despite the various interpretations, the performance by Le Clercq and Moncion is generally deemed closest to Robbins' ideas.

== Performances ==
Afternoon of a Faun premiered on May 14, 1953, at the City Center of Music and Drama. The ballet continues to be a mainstay in the New York City Ballet's repertory. Between 1958 and 1961, Afternoon of a Faun was performed by Ballets: USA, Robbins' company, during their State Department-funded tours. During these tours, John Jones, a black dancer, was paired with Wilma Curley, and later Kay Mazzo, both white women.

Since the 1970s, Afternoon of a Faun has been performed by other ballet companies. The Royal Ballet first performed the ballet in 1971, featuring Antoinette Sibley and Anthony Dowell. The Australian Ballet made their debut of the ballet in 1978, with Marilyn Rowe and Gary Norman. The Norwegian National Ballet, the Bolshoi Ballet and San Francisco Ballet had their respective company premieres of the ballet in 1991, 2000 and 2006 respectively. Other ballet companies that had danced Afternoon of a Faun include the Paris Opera Ballet, American Ballet Theatre, Royal Danish Ballet, La Scala Ballet, National Ballet of Canada and Dance Theatre of Harlem. Robbins also allowed Valery Panov to perform the ballet without paying royalty fees.

== Videography ==
The only footage of Le Clercq and Moncion in Afternoon of a Faun is an amateur silent black-and-white film that was shot from the side.

Canadian Broadcasting Corporation filmed a performance of Afternoon of a Faun, featuring Le Clercq and Jacques d'Amboise.

In 1980, the ballet was among several of Robbins' work that was filmed for NBC's series Live from Studio 8H, with Patricia McBride and Ib Andersen performing.

In 2016, Afternoon of a Faun was included on a Royal Ballet DVD, danced by Sarah Lamb and Vadim Muntagirov.

In 2020, during the New York City Ballet's digital spring season, which replaced the canceled repertory season caused by the COVID-19 pandemic, the company released an archival video of Sterling Hyltin and Joseph Gordon performing the ballet in 2018.
