= London Confession of Faith =

London Confession of Faith may refer to:

- Confession of Faith (1644), a Particular Baptist creed, also known as the First London Confession of Faith
- Confession of Faith (1689), a Particular Baptist creed, also known as the Second London Confession of Faith

== See also ==
- Confession of Faith (disambiguation)
