= Articles of Faith (disambiguation) =

Articles of Faith usually refers to a creed.

Articles of Faith may also refer to:

- Articles of Faith (band), an American hardcore punk band
- The Six Articles of Faith in Islam
- Articles of Faith (Latter Day Saints), a canonized Latter Day Saint creed
- Articles of Faith (Brand), a 2008 book by Russell Brand
- Articles of Faith (Talmage), an 1899 book by James E. Talmage
- "Articles of Faith" (Dead Zone), an episode of the television series The Dead Zone
- "Article of Faith", a 2009 short story by Mike Resnick

== See also ==
- Confession of Faith (disambiguation)
