= Afternoon of a Faun (Rushton) =

Ballet written by Tim Rushton

Afternoon of a Faun is a ballet made by Danish Dance Theatre balletmaster Tim Rushton on Johan Kobborg; principal dancer at the Royal Ballet, London; to Debussy's Prélude à l'après-midi d'un faune.

The premiere took place in February 2006 at New York City Center as part of the Kings of the Dance gala and subsequently at Orange County Performing Arts Center, Costa Mesa, Calif. Kobborg performed it again in October 2007 as part of City Center's Fall for Dance festival. Both Rushton and Kobburg danced for the Royal Danish Ballet earlier in their careers, Kobburg a principal there as well as in London.

Rushton's setting differs materially from Nijinsky's original in its use of three pools of light produced by beam projectors which appear successively stage center, left and right (center, right and left from the audience's perspective), in which the faun / dancer capers and bathes; it resembles what is known of the original mostly in its costuming.

== Reviews ==
- NY Times by John Rockwell, February 25, 2006
- NY Times by Gia Kourlas, February 23, 2006

- Ballet.co.uk Magazine by Anjuli Bai, February 2006
- NY Times by Roslyn Sulcas, October 4, 2007
