= L'après-midi d'un faune (poem) =

1876 poem by Stéphane Mallarmé

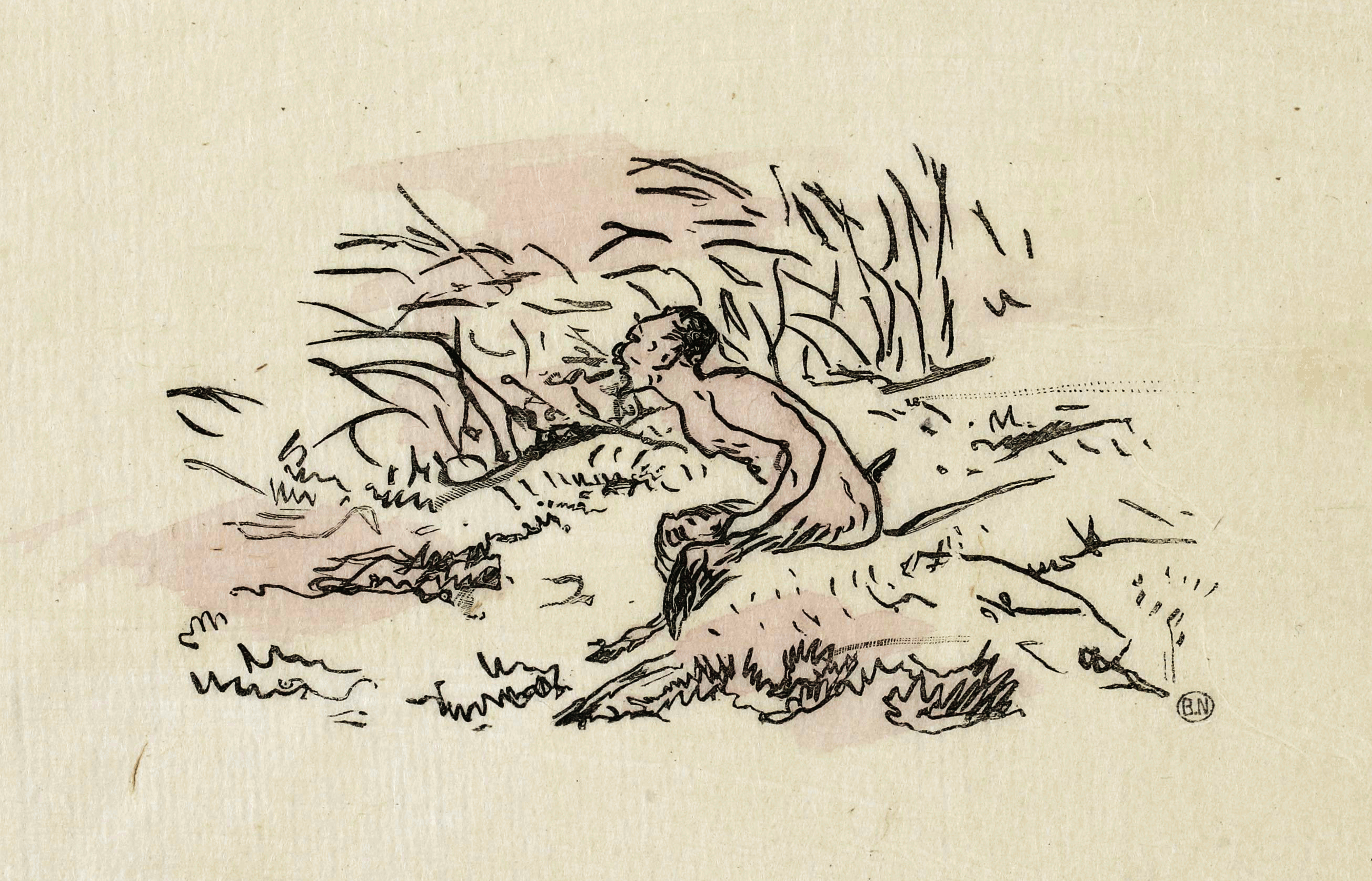
Frontispiece for L'après-midi d'un faune, drawing by Édouard Manet.

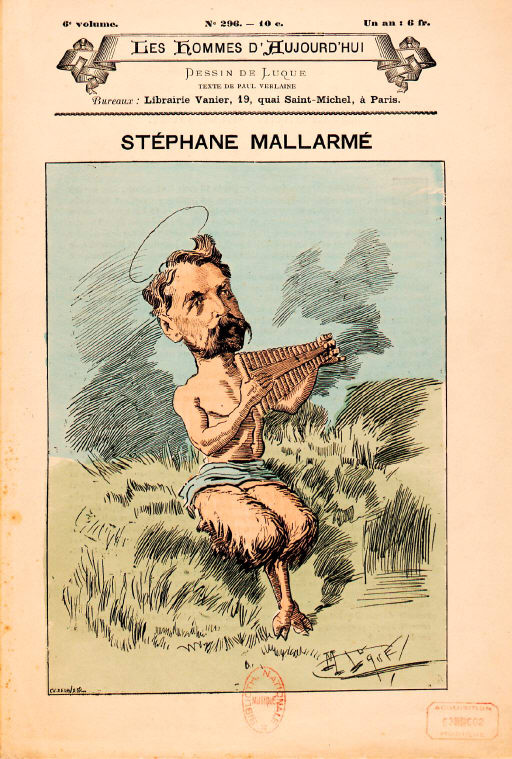
Stéphane Mallarmé as a faun, cover of the literary magazine Les hommes d'aujourd'hui, 1887

"L'après-midi d'un faune" ("The Afternoon of a Faun") is a poem by the French author Stéphane Mallarmé. It describes the sensual experiences of a faun who has just woken up from his afternoon sleep and discusses his encounters with several nymphs during the morning in a dreamlike monologue.

It is Mallarmé's best-known work and a landmark in the history of Symbolism in French literature. Paul Valéry considered it to be the greatest poem in French literature.

== History ==
Initial versions of the poem, originally titled Le Faune, intermède héroique, were written between 1865 (the first mention of the poem is found in a letter Mallarmé wrote to Henri Cazalis in June 1865) and 1867. Mallarmé submitted the first text to the Théâtre-Français in 1867, only to be rejected. Ten years later, under the title Improvisation d’un Faune the work was rejected again, this time by publisher Alphonse Lemerre, who had previously published Mallarmé's work in Parnasse contemporain. Mallarmé left Lemerre and found Alphonse Derenne, an editor, publisher, and bookseller of primarily medical books who sought to expand his business. The final text was published in 1876 (see 1876 in poetry) by Derenne under the present title "L'après-midi d'un faune". For the publication, Mallarmé's long-time friend, Édouard Manet, created four wood-engraved embellishments which were printed in black, and hand-tinted in pink by Manet himself in order to save money.

Mallarmé's poem would provide the inspiration for many musical works, the most prominent of which being Prélude à l'après-midi d'un faune by Claude Debussy. Other composers who drew subject matter and inspiration from Mallarmé's poetry include Maurice Ravel in Trois poèmes de Mallarmé (1913), Darius Milhaud with Chansons bas de Stéphane Mallarmé (1917), and Pierre Boulez, with his hour-long solo soprano and orchestra piece Pli selon pli (1957–62). The poem also served basis for the ballets Afternoon of a Faun by Vaslav Nijinsky (1912), Jerome Robbins (1953) and Tim Rushton (2006). Debussy's orchestral work and Nijinsky's ballet would be of great significance in the development of modernism in the arts.

== Editions ==
=== Translations ===
- (English) The Afternoon of the Faun, translated by Roger Fry, in The Poems of Mallarmé, Chatto and Windus, 1936 OCLC 1616026
- (English) A Faun in the Afternoon, translated by E. H. Blackmore and A. M. Blackmore, in Collected Poems and Other Verse, 2006
- (English) Collected Poems: A Bilingual Edition, Stéphane Mallarmé, translated by Henry Weinfield, University of California Press, OCLC 9780520948112 (1st edition 1994 ISBN 9780520948112; 2nd edition 2011 ISBN 0520948114)
- (Finnish) Faunin iltapäivä: valitut runot, Einari Aaltonen, 2006

== Sources ==
- Hendrik Lücke. Mallarmé - Debussy. Eine vergleichende Studie zur Kunstanschauung am Beispiel von "L'Après-midi d'un Faune". (Studien zur Musikwissenschaft, Vol. 4). Dr. Kovac, Hamburg 2005, ISBN 3-8300-1685-9.
