= Articles of Faith (Brand book) =

Book by Russell Brand

- Author: Russell Brand
- Language: English
- Publication date: 16 October 2008

Articles of Faith is a book that collects Russell Brand's football columns for The Guardian newspaper between June 2007 through May 2008. It was released on 16 October 2008. The columns focused on West Ham United and the England national football team. The book also includes Brand interviewing Noel Gallagher, James Corden and David Baddiel about football.
