= Confession of Faith (disambiguation) =

A confession of faith is a statement of faith, also known as a creed or symbol of faith.

Confession of faith or Confession of Faith may also refer to:

- Confession of Faith (1644), a Particular Baptist creed published in 1644
- Confession of Faith (1689), a Particular Baptist creed written in 1677 and adopted in 1689
- Confession of Faith (United Methodist), United Methodist creed adopted in 1968

== See also ==
- Articles of Faith (disambiguation)
