= ASOIF =

ASOIF may refer to:

- Association of Summer Olympic International Federations, a non-profit association affiliated with the International Olympic Committee.
- A Song of Ice and Fire, an ongoing series of epic fantasy novels written by George R. R. Martin
