= Agnes of France =

Agnes of France may refer to:

- Agnes of France (empress) (1171 – after 1207), daughter of Louis VII of France and Adèle of Champagne; wife of Alexios II Komnenos, Andronikos I Komnenos, Theodore Branas
- Agnes of France, Duchess of Burgundy (c. 1260–1327), daughter of Louis IX of France and Margaret of Provence; wife of Robert II, Duke of Burgundy
