= Deja Perkins =

American scientist

- Alma mater: North Carolina State University; Tuskegee University
- Occupation: Ecologist, science communicator, bird watcher

Deja Perkins is an American urban ecologist. She has spoken out vocally against racism in STEM fields, is a co-organizer of Black Birders Week, and has acted as president of the BlackAFinSTEM collective.

== Education and academic career ==
Perkins grew up in Chicago, Illinois. She describes herself as a long-time animal lover. She was introduced to natural resources in high school when her mother enrolled her in "Fishin' Buddies!", a program that aimed to introduce young Chicagoans to science and nature. Perkins originally intended to be a veterinarian, a path she identified as "often the only animal-related career introduced to POC," but realized she was more interested in the relationship between people and the environment as an undergraduate student at Tuskegee University.

While a junior at Tuskegee, she was selected as one of 28 winners of the 2017 United States Department of Agriculture (USDA) Agricultural Outlook Forum Diversity Program. She completed a Student Conservation Association internship with the United States Fish and Wildlife Service at the Minnesota Valley National Wildlife Refuge. She graduated from Tuskegee in 2018 with a Bachelor of Science in Environmental, Natural Resources, and Plant Sciences.

Perkins holds a Master of Science in Fisheries, Wildlife, and Conservation Biology from North Carolina State University. Her master's thesis, titled Blind Spots in Citizen Science Data: Implications of Volunteer Biases in eBird Data, examined the methodology and protocol design of citizen science birding projects in North Carolina, Arizona, and California. As a master's student, she was a 2018-2019 USGS Southeast Climate Adaptation Science Center Global Change Fellow.

As of 2025, Perkins is a PhD student at NC State's Center for Geospatial Analytics, where she examines the spatial data gaps in environmental participatory projects to engage underserved communities in environmental monitoring and better understand conservation and nature gaps in urban neighborhoods. Some of her current interests are in the intersection of environmental justice and conservation, where she aims to study and take a closer look to how human culture and bias have impacted avian habitat destruction in cities. Some of her latest projects and work are conservation efforts that aim to target climate change in urbanized cities and metropolitan areas. . Perkins is a member of the IDEAL Participatory Science Working group.

== Activism and science communication work ==
Perkins is the CEO of Naturally Wild LLC, an organization that "empowers Black-identifying individuals and people of color to explore and engage with the wildlife and natural spaces in their neighborhoods." Founded in 2021, Naturally Wild LLC hosts birding workshops, organizes speaking engagements, and curates specialty programming for other organizations.

=== Black Birders Week ===
In May 2020, Perkins co-organized the inaugural Black Birders Week with 19 other young STEM professionals in response to the Central Park birdwatching incident and police brutality against Black Americans. The event runs annually during the first week of June. In a guest post for NC State's College of Natural Resources webpage, Perkins stated that

[The inaugural Black Birders Week] not only highlighted the struggle of Black people in outdoor settings and our struggle with racism in America, but also shined some positivity in an otherwise dark time. Due to this event, I was able to find a network of individuals who look like me and enjoy the outdoors. I was shocked to find out how many Black people were also birders, since prior to this event I only knew six other Black birders and only two were in my same state. It’s encouraging to know that I am not alone, and reaffirms that I do belong in this field. The visibility provided the larger organizations and institutions the opportunity to see that racism exists everywhere, even in science, academia, and the outdoors. It challenged those with power to not only speak up and support their employees or consumers who are Black, but also take an active role in being anti-racist and make changes within their institutions to support BIPOC and make the workplace and outdoors less hostile.

== Awards and honors ==
Perkins has been the recipient of various awards for her academic and advocacy work, including the following.

- Audubon North Carolina Bird Lore Conservation Education Award (2022)
- National Wildlife Federation's National Conservation Achievement Award for Young Leaders (2022)
- U.S. Fish & Wildlife Teddy Roosevelt Conservation Award (2015)

In 2022, she was honored by North Carolina Governor Roy Cooper as a Black STEM Leader. She is a former NC State Provost Fellow (2018-2019), Southeast Climate Adaptation Science Center Global Change Fellow (2018-2019), and Tuskegee Presidential Scholar (2014-2018).
