= Academy of Florence =

Academy of Florence or Accademia di Firenze or Accademia Fiorentina or Florentine Academy may refer to:

- The Platonic Academy (Florence), founded in 1460 by Marsilio Ficino
- The Accademia Fiorentina, founded in Florence in 1540 and merged with the Accademia della Crusca and Accademia degli Apatisti in 1783
- The Accademia Fiorentina delle Arti del Disegno, founded in 1563
- The Accademia del Cimento (Academy of Experiment), founded in 1657
- The Accademia di Belle Arti di Firenze, separated from the Accademia delle Arti del Disegno by Grand Duke Pietro Leopoldo in 1784, an instructional art academy in Florence
- The Galleria dell'Accademia, an art museum in Florence
