= Atheists of Florida =

Nonprofit organization in the United States

Atheists of Florida (A of F) is a 501(c)(3) educational nonprofit organization. Their main goal is to advocate about separation of church and state. This group was dissolved in March 2024.

== History ==
Atheists of Florida, like many other atheist groups affiliated with the Atheist Alliance, began as a chapter of American Atheists (AA).

During the 1980s, AA operated a chapter program intended to increase membership through the activities of these chapters. To indemnify the organization from being financially depleted through a lawsuit, Madalyn Murray O'Hair, founder of AA, formed six organizations in addition to the anchor corporation, Society of Separationists, Inc. A board of directors was established for each corporation consisting of O'Hair, her son, Jon Murray, president for life of American Atheists, her adopted granddaughter, Robin Murray O'Hair, and two other members of AA. This way, the O'Hair family retained complete control of all corporations.

O'Hair structured the business to provide for the future of her family. Any funds inherited by the organization became the private property of the O'Hair family, never accounted for within the organization.

Christos Tzanetakos, Director of the Miami Chapter of AA and a member of one of the corporate boards, expressed concerns about how AA was being run. He asserted it should be run according to laws governing 501(c)(3) organizations whereby the membership would elect the officers, similar to the operating practices of the National Academy of Sciences. AA, he contended, was in violation of non-profit organization laws. Tzanetakos complained to the IRS suggesting AA was operating in violation of the law. O'Hair responded by closing all but one of the chapters (the surviving chapter was involved in litigation at the time). Tzanetakos had accumulated over $6,000 in donations he intended to use to instigate a scholarship fund sponsored by the Miami chapter. Chapter bank accounts had been opened using the AA 501(c)(3) charter documents in each state, which subsequently gave the O'Hairs access to all bank accounts. The O'Hairs closed the chapter.

Tzanetakos, with the backing of his membership, decided to incorporate Atheists of Florida (A of F), which was done January 22, 1992.

A second AA chapter had been operating in the Tampa Bay Area. When closed with all the others, it continued to hold casual meetings that accomplished little more than camaraderie among the members.

Upon formation of A of F, Tzanetakos contacted the Tampa chapter informing them of his actions and explaining that if a minimum of ten members from a common geographic area joined A of F, they could form a chapter. The local chapter consented to become members of A of F.

The Miami chapter eventually dissolved while the Tampa Bay chapter continued to grow. Increasingly, the majority of board members came from the Tampa Bay area, and eventually the Tampa chapter obtained space in a commercial building in South Tampa, which evolved into the headquarters of the organization.

== Controversy ==
=== 2004 Invocation to Tampa City Council ===
On July 29, 2004, a member of Atheists of Florida, Michael R. Harvey, was scheduled to give the invocation to the Tampa City Council. As the meeting opened, one of the City Council members made a motion to stop the delivery of the invocation by an atheist. Several council members defended the right of the member to deliver the invocation. The motion ended in a tie, after one council member left the meeting, asserting that "I don't have to sit here and listen to an atheist tell me what I should or should not believe." With the invocation set to begin, another two council members left the meeting, claiming that they would rather not listen to an atheist.

=== Religious intrusion into public schools ===
In January, 2016, Atheists of Florida met with the Hillsborough County Schools superintendent concerning the involvement of various religious groups in the public school system and the oversight of these groups to ensure they are following the constitution. This followed the press coverage of T-shirts supplied to various school officials proclaiming the school's partnership with a local Baptist church, along with the church's symbol on the shirts, which consisted of two crosses. Other groups were found to be participating in the schools in what appeared to be violation of the Equal Access Act. The school board has responded with an effort to ensure that all groups are following the constitution.

Some of these same groups are involved in school districts throughout the state of Florida, Atheists of Florida have contacted several other school districts in regard to the involvement of these groups in their school district.

== Invocations since 2014 ==
After the Greece, New York, decision by the Supreme Court, Atheists of Florida members have delivered invocations on several occasions to various local government bodies, all without incident.
