= Act of Faith =

Act of Faith may refer to:

- Act of Faith (Christian), a prayer said by persons at the age of accountability
- "Act of Faith" (Presence song)
- Act of Faith (album), an album by Mucky Pup
- "Act of Faith," a 1946 short story by Irwin Shaw
- "Act of Faith", a song by Katey Sagal from Well...
- Auto-da-fé, the ritual of public penance of condemned heretics and apostates
