= Linda Black Elk =

American ethnobotanist and food sovereignty activist

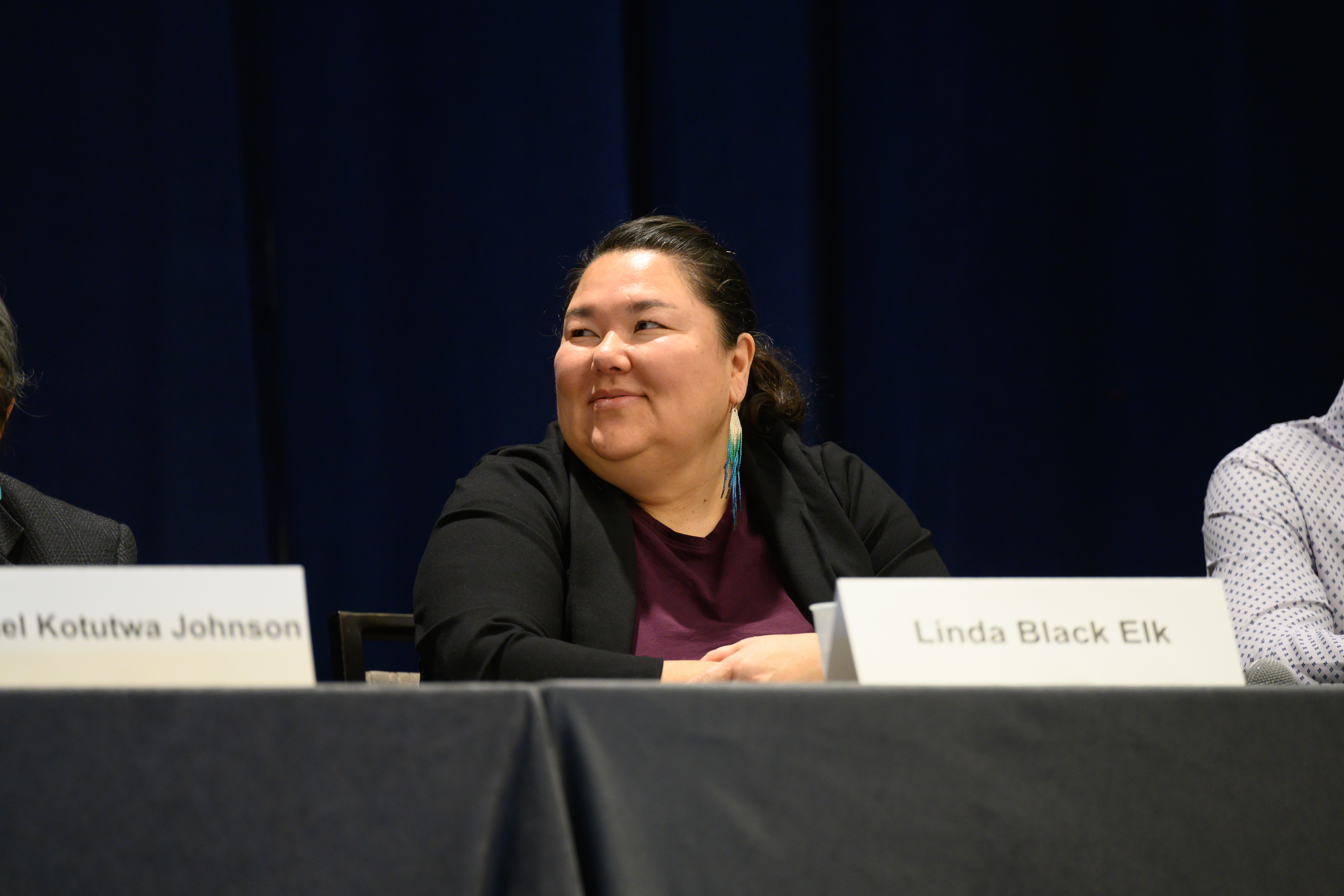
- Linda Black Elk at the 2024 Agricultural Outlook Forum
- Born: Ohio
- Citizenship: American
- Occupations: botanist, educator, activist
- Notable work: Native Science: Understanding and Respecting Other Ways of Thinking (2016)

Linda Black Elk is an American ethnobotanist, educator, and food sovereignty activist in the field of traditional Indigenous foodways.

== Background ==
Linda Black Elk's biography states she is a "diverse mix of Korean, Mongolian, and Catawba ancestry. Linda's mother came to the United States from Korea.

Black Elk was raised in the Ohio valley, and her knowledge began with learning about edible and medicinal plants from her mother and grandmother, before she continued to pursue her education in field of ethnobotany.

Linda Black Elk is married to Luke Black Elk, a citizen of the Cheyenne River Sioux. They work together in learning and educating about traditional native foods and medicines.

== Career and activism ==
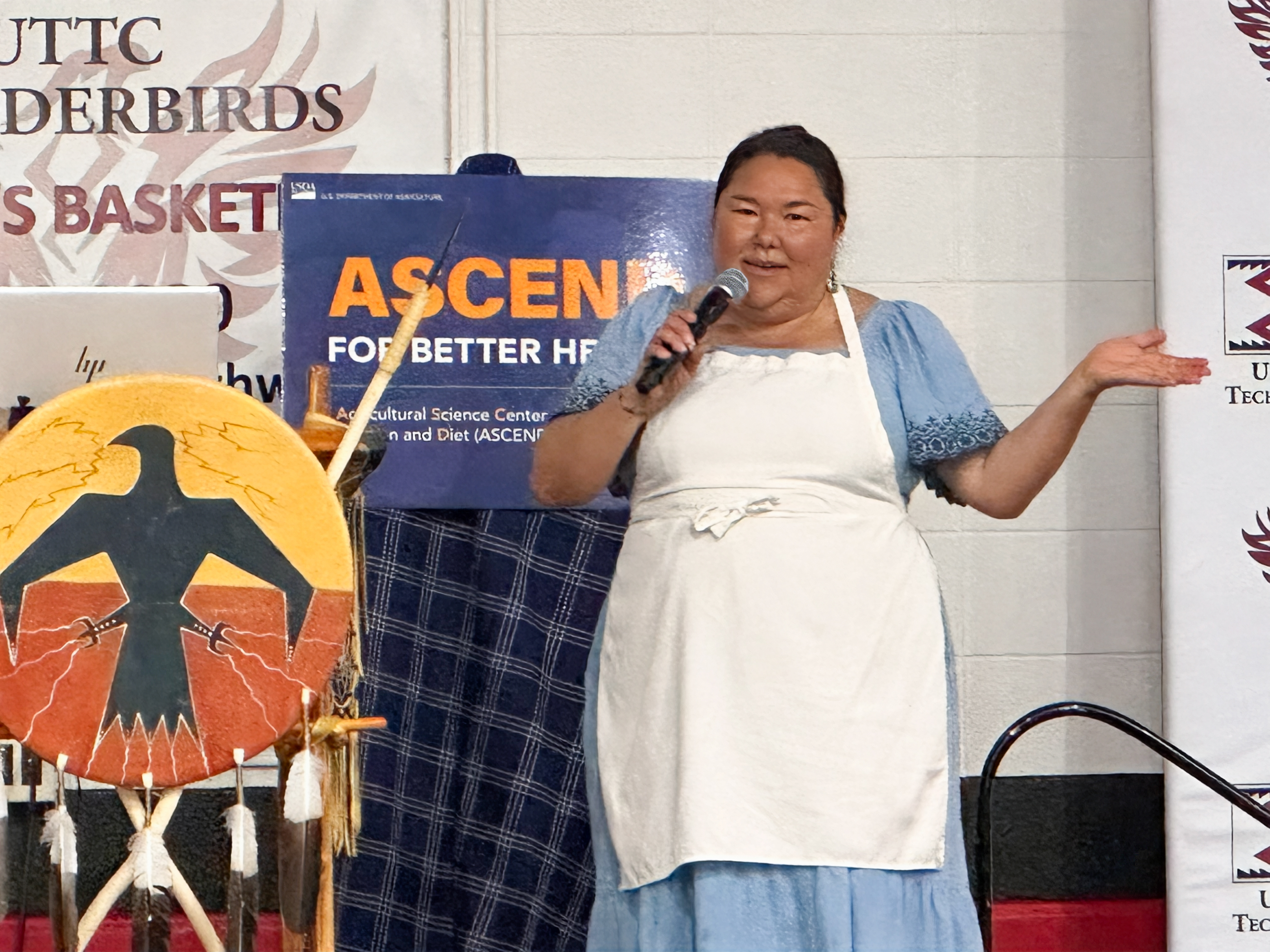
Linda Black Elk speaking at United Tribes Technical College community engagement event in Bismarck, North Dakota co-hosted by USDA on May 31, 2023

Linda Black Elk has served as Food Sovereignty Coordinator at United Tribes Technical College and joined North American Traditional Indigenous Food Systems in 2023 as Education Director. Black Elk is also a founding member of Mni Wiconi Health Circle, and an advocate and active supporter of various Native environmental justice movements. She also contributes to shared knowledge sources as an author of multiple scientific articles.

== Controversy ==
The Catawba Nation issued a cease-and-desist letter to Black Elk in 2024. In a 2021 video, Black Elk stated she was a "member of the Catawba Nation." Catawba Nation issued a cease-and-desist letter addressed to Black Elk and another group, naming them as “individuals and groups falsely claiming affiliation with the Tribe”. Catawba Nation noted that citizenship and recognition are governed by specific Tribal and federal criteria.

== Writing ==
Black Elk authored Development of the Renewal on the Standing Rock Sioux Reservation Project, published in the Rangelands Journal, which addresses some of the current issues on the Standing Rock Sioux Reservation, and discusses possible paths forward. This leads into Linda Black Elk's article, Native Science: Understanding and Respecting Other Ways of Thinking, featured in the Journal, Rangelands. In this article, Black Elk details the value of Native ways of knowing in science, specifically towards rangelands management.

Linda Black Elk is also an author of:

- Centering Indigenous Knowledges in ecology and beyond and A path to reconciliation between Indigenous and settler–colonial epistemologies, both published in Frontiers in the Environment and Ecology.
- Ethnobiology Phase VI: Decolonizing Institutions, Projects, and Scholarship, published in The Journal of Ethnobiology
