= Art of Fighting (disambiguation) =

Art of Fighting is a series of video games released in the 1990s.

Art of Fighting may also refer to:

- Art of Fighting (video game), the first game in the Art of Fighting series
- Art of Fighting, an anime television special based on the first video game
- Art of Fighting (band), an Australian indie rock band
- Art of Fighting (film), a South Korean film
- Art of Fighting Anthology, a video game compilation of the Art of Fighting series for PlayStation 2
