= Articles of Federation =

Articles of Federation can refer to:

- Document that created the United Federation of Planets in Star Trek
- The Star Trek novel Articles of the Federation by Keith R.A. DeCandido
