= Archbishop of Finland =

Archbishop of Finland can refer to:

- the Evangelical Lutheran Archbishop of Turku
- the Eastern Orthodox Archbishop of Finland
