= AOTF =

AOTF may refer to:

- Acousto-optic tunable filter, a piezoelectric optical device
- American Occupational Therapy Foundation, a non-profit charitable, scientific and educational organization.
- Admiral of the Fleet, the highest rank in the British Royal Navy

AotF may refer to:

- The Age of the Fall (AF), a wrestling stable
- Army Of The Pharaohs (AP) - American hip-hop group

Acousto-optics#Acousto-optic_tunable_filter
