= Prélude à l'après-midi d'un faune =

Symphonic poem by Claude Debussy

- Symphonic poem by Claude Debussy
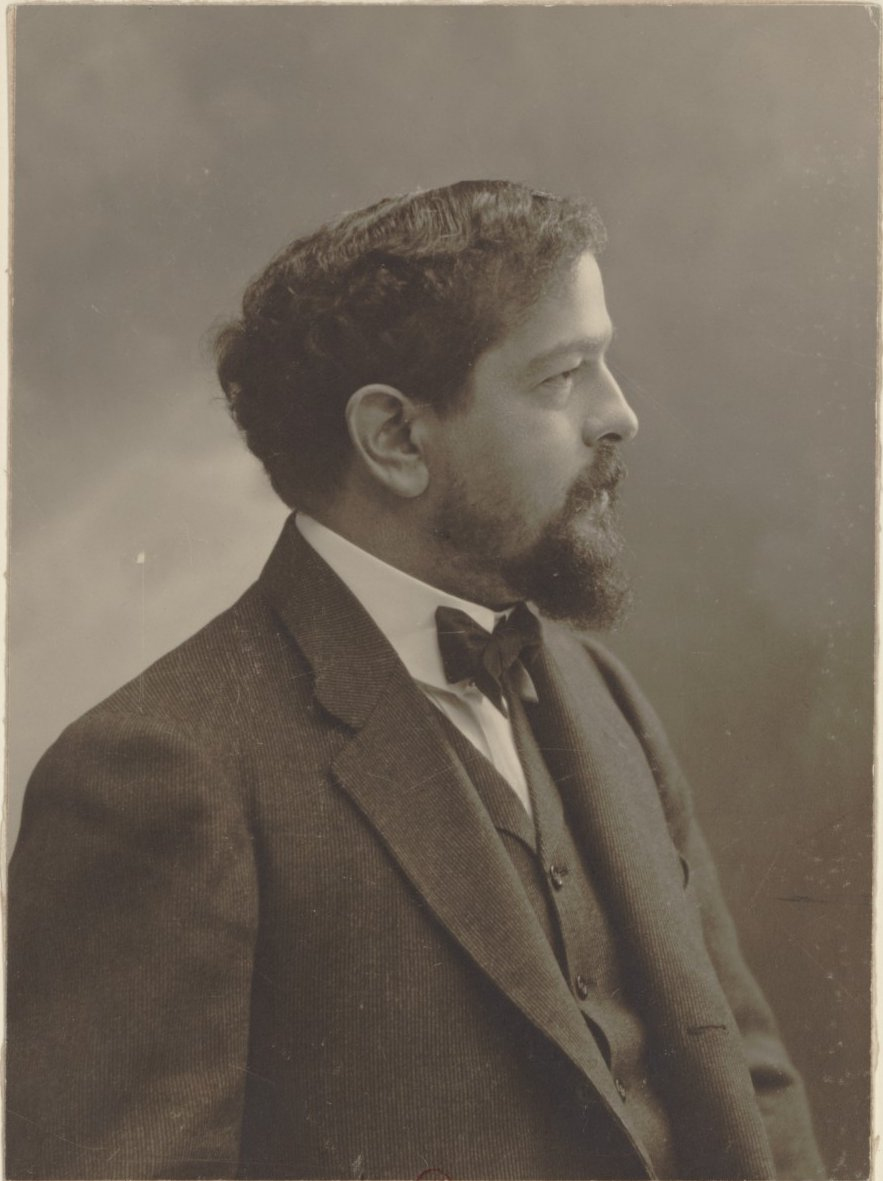
- Claude Debussy in 1905
- English: Prelude to the Afternoon of a Faun
- Catalogue: L. 86
- Based on: L'après-midi d'un faune by Stéphane Mallarmé
- Composed: 1894

Premiere
- Date: 22 December 1894
- Location: Paris, France
- Conductor: Gustave Doret
- Performers: Georges Barrère (flute)

Prélude à l'Après-midi d'un faune (L. 86), known in English as Prelude to the Afternoon of a Faun, is a symphonic poem for orchestra by Claude Debussy, approximately 10 minutes in duration. It was composed in 1894 and first performed in Paris on 22 December 1894, conducted by Gustave Doret. The flute solo was played by Georges Barrère.

The composition was inspired by the poem L'après-midi d'un faune by Stéphane Mallarmé. It is one of Debussy's most famous works and is considered a turning point in the history of Western art music, as well as a masterpiece of Impressionist composition. Pierre Boulez considered the score to be the beginning of modern music, observing that "the flute of the faun brought new breath to the art of music." The work is dedicated to the composer Raymond Bonheur, son of the painter Auguste Bonheur.

Debussy's work later provided the basis for the ballet Afternoon of a Faun choreographed by Vaslav Nijinsky and a later version by Jerome Robbins.

== Background ==
About his composition, Debussy wrote that:

The music of this prelude is a very free illustration of Mallarmé's beautiful poem. By no means does it claim to be a synthesis of it. Rather there is a succession of scenes through which pass the desires and dreams of the faun in the heat of the afternoon. Then, tired of pursuing the timorous flight of nymphs and naiads, he succumbs to intoxicating sleep, in which he can finally realize his dreams of possession in universal Nature.

Paul Valéry recorded the observation that upon being informed of Debussy's composition, Mallarmé himself was unhappy with his poem being used as the basis for music:

He believed that his own music was sufficient, and that even with the best intentions in the world, it was a veritable crime as far as poetry was concerned to juxtapose poetry and music, even if it were the finest music there is.

However, his opinion changed after attending the premiere performance at Debussy's invitation; Mallarmé wrote to him that:

I have just come out of the concert, deeply moved. The marvel! Your illustration of the Afternoon of a Faun, which presents no dissonance with my text, but goes much further, really, into nostalgia and into light, with finesse, with sensuality, with richness. I shake your hand admiringly, Debussy. Yours, Mallarmé.

== Composition ==
Performed by Natalia Ensemble, 2014

The work is scored for three flutes, two oboes, cor anglais, two clarinets in A and B♭, two bassoons, four horns, two harps, two crotales and strings.

Although many refer to the Prélude à l'Après-midi d'un faune as a tone poem, it lacks the musically programmatic form of the style; instead, the slow and mediated melody and layered orchestration as a whole evoke the eroticism of Mallarmé's poem.

[This prelude] was [Debussy's] musical response to the poem of Stephane Mallarmé (1842–1898), in which a faun playing his pan-pipes alone in the woods becomes aroused by passing nymphs and naiads, pursues them unsuccessfully, then wearily abandons himself to a sleep filled with visions. Though called a "prelude," the work is nevertheless complete – an evocation of the feelings of the poem as a whole.

Debussy had intended to compose a second and third movement, an Interlude and Paraphrase finale, respectively, but he decided to concentrate all of his musical ideas into one movement.

The Prélude at first listening seems improvisational and almost free-form; however, closer observation will demonstrate that the piece consists of a complex organization of musical cells, motifs carefully developed and traded between members of the orchestra. A close analysis of the piece reveals a high degree of compositional consciousness on Debussy's part.

The main musical themes are introduced by woodwinds, with delicate but harmonically advanced accompaniment of muted horns, strings and harp. Recurring tools in Debussy's compositional arsenal make appearances in this piece: extended whole-tone scale runs, harmonic fluidity without lengthy modulations between central keys, and tritones in both melody and harmony. The opening flute solo consists of a chromatic descent to a tritone below the original pitch and then subsequent ascent. The development of the slow main theme transitions smoothly between 9/8, 6/8, and 12/8. Debussy uses sophisticated voicings and orchestration, allowing the main melodic cell to move from solo flute to oboe, back to solo flute, then to two unison flutes (yielding a completely different atmosphere to the melody), then to clarinet, and so on. Even the accompaniment explores alternate voicings: the flute duo's crescendo during their melodic cells accompany legato strings with violas carrying the soprano part over alto violins (the tone of a viola in its upper register being especially pronounced).

Main theme
Ambiguous chord progression
Theme
Theme – similar to the main theme in chromaticism and contour. Uses a whole-tone scale in m. 32.
Theme – similar contour to the main theme.
Secondary theme
Theme – new melodic idea created by combining fragments of two previous melodies.
Theme – related to main theme.
Final chromatic harmonization of the main theme

The composition totals 110 bars. If one counts the incomplete lines of verse as one, Mallarmé's text likewise adds up to 110 lines. The second section in D♭ starts at bar 55, exactly halfway through the work.

The piece is scored for orchestra including 3 flutes, 2 oboes, English horn, 2 clarinets, 2 bassoons, 4 horns, 2 harps, 2 crotales, and strings.

== Ballet versions ==
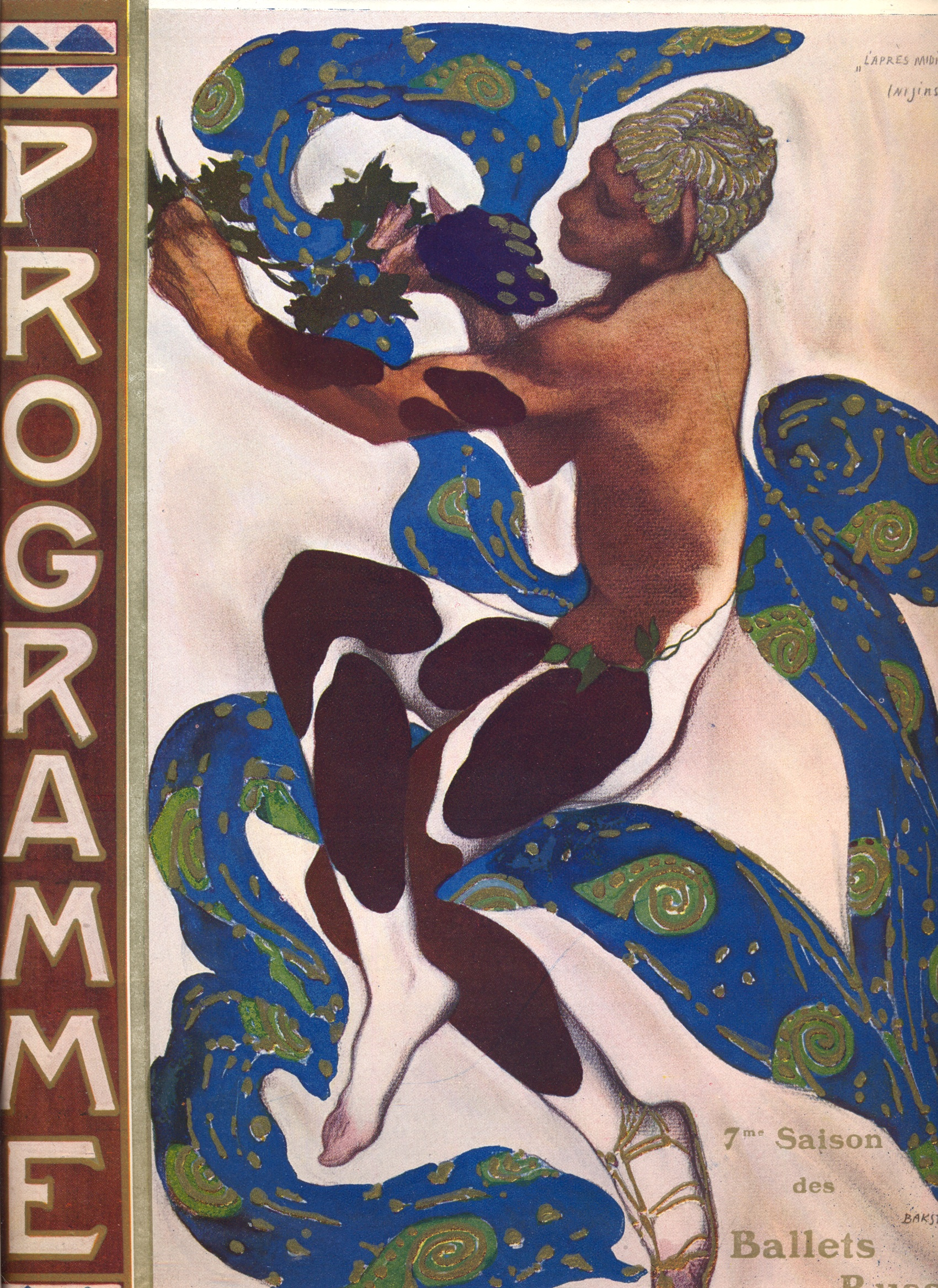
Illustration by Léon Bakst for the ballet Afternoon of a Faun by Nijinsky, after Debussy's music

In 1912, the piece was made into a short ballet, with costumes and sets by painter Léon Bakst, which was choreographed and performed by the renowned dancer Vaslav Nijinsky. It proved to be highly controversial because of the dancers' non-traditional movements and because of a moment in which the faun appears to masturbate.

In 1958, another ballet by Jerome Robbins was made, which has been frequently performed by many companies.

== Literature ==
In Thomas Mann's The Magic Mountain it is implied that protagonist Hans Castorp listened to Debussy's piece on a gramophone. In the book, the Prélude is one of his favorite recordings, and leads him to daydream about a faun playing pipes in an oneiric landscape.

== Cinema ==
In Bruno Bozzetto's 1976 animation film Allegro non troppo, Debussy's Prélude drives the first animation section, depicting an elderly satyr that attempts in vain to cosmetically recapture his youth and virility.

== Transcription ==
Claude Debussy himself transcribed the piece for performance on two pianos in 1895.

Other transcriptions include: the arrangement of Maurice Ravel for piano four hands, the flute and piano version of Gustave Samazeuilh, the arrangement for Pierrot ensemble (flute, clarinet, violin, cello and piano) by Tim Mulleman, a transcription for flute, clarinet and piano by Michael Webster, and an arrangement for the instruments of Ravel's Introduction and Allegro (flute, clarinet, harp and string quartet) with an additional double bass, by Graeme Steele Johnson. The Russian pianist Vyacheslav Gryaznov also transcribed it for solo piano. Linos Piano Trio arranged the piece for piano trio and included it on their 2021 album Stolen Music. Another version was transcribed by composer Paolo Fradiani for flute, oboe, clarinet, horn, harp and strings, and published by Universal Edition.

Benno Sachs, a pupil of Arnold Schoenberg, reorchestrated the work for a chamber ensemble which included a piano and a harmonium, for Schoenberg's Society for Private Musical Performances, which took place on 27 October 1920.
