= Afternoon of a Faun (Nijinsky) =

1912 ballet by Vaslav Nijinsky

L'Après-midi d'un faune
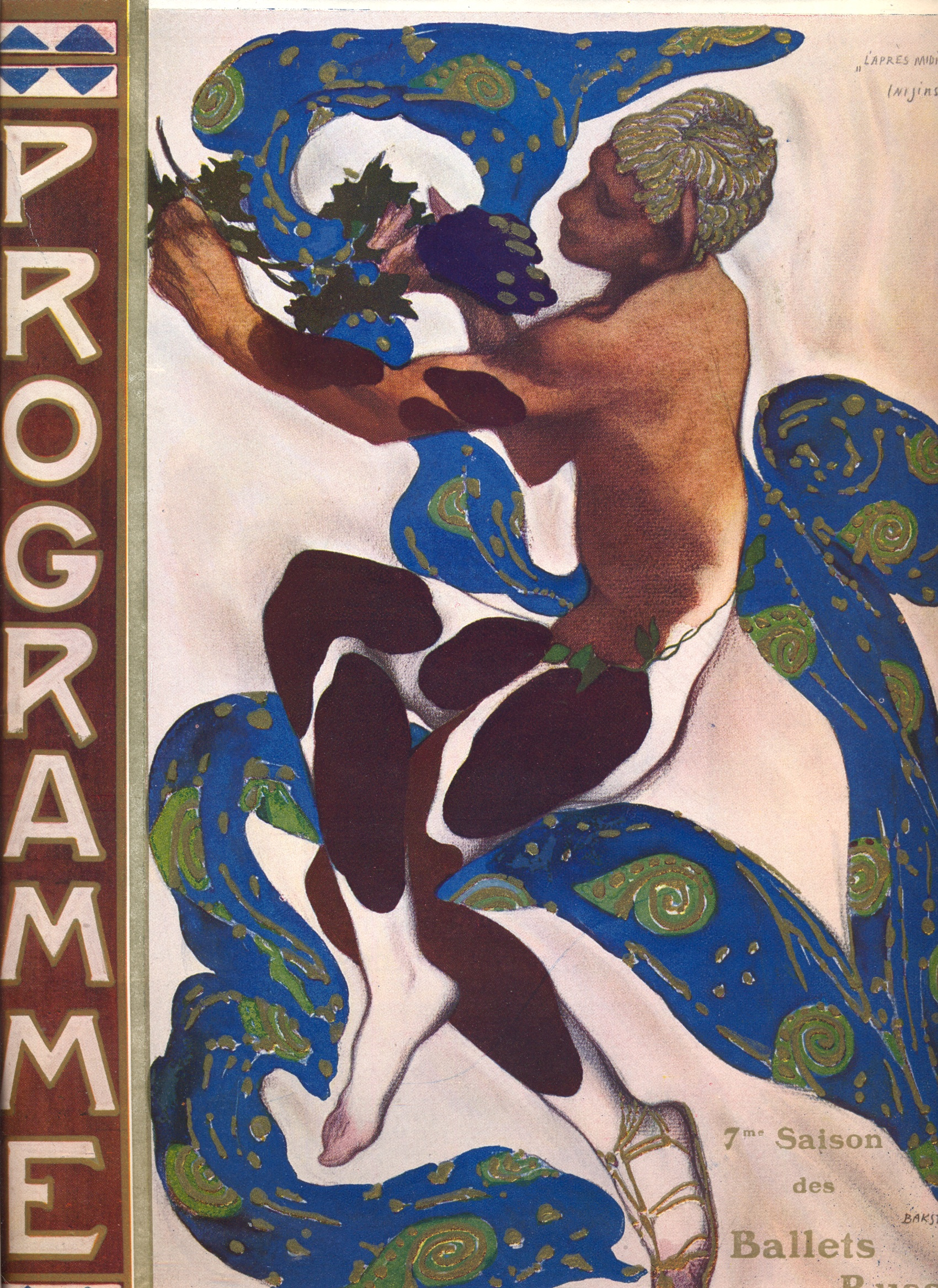
- Programme illustration by Léon Bakst for the ballet
- Choreographer: Vaslav Nijinsky
- Music: Claude Debussy
- Based on: L'Après-midi d'un faune by Stéphane Mallarmé
- Premiere: 29 May 1912; Théâtre du Châtelet in Paris
- Original ballet company: Ballets Russes
- Design: Léon Bakst
- Setting: Woodland glade
- Created for: Sergei Diaghilev

The Afternoon of a Faun (French: L'Après-midi d'un faune) is a ballet choreographed by Vaslav Nijinsky for the Ballets Russes, and was first performed in the Théâtre du Châtelet in Paris on 29 May 1912. Nijinsky danced the main part himself. The ballet is set to Claude Debussy's symphonic poem Prélude à l'après-midi d'un faune. Both the music and the ballet were inspired by the poem L'Après-midi d'un faune by Stéphane Mallarmé. The costumes, sets and programme illustrations were designed by the painter Léon Bakst.

The style of the 12-minute ballet, in which a young faun meets several nymphs and proceeds to flirt with and chase them, was deliberately archaic. In the original scenography designed by Léon Bakst, the dancers were presented as part of a large tableau, a staging reminiscent of an ancient Greek vase painting. They often moved across the stage in profile as if on a bas relief. The ballet was presented in bare feet and rejected classical formalism. The work had an overtly erotic subtext beneath its façade of Greek antiquity and ended with a scene of graphic sexual desire. This led to a controversial reception from both audience and critics, and the quality of the ballet was debated widely through multiple news reviews. The piece also led to the dissolution of a partnership between Nijinsky and Michel Fokine, another prominent choreographer for the Ballets Russes, due to the extensive amount of time required to train the dancers in what was then an unconventional style of dance.

L'Après-midi d'un Faune is considered one of the first modern ballets and proved to be as controversial as Nijinsky's Jeux (1913) and Le Sacre du printemps (1913).

== Creation ==
=== Conception ===
The ballet was developed as a possible new production for Sergei Diaghilev's Ballets Russes. Michel Fokine choreographed most of the dances that the company performed. Fokine had originally worked as a choreographer with the Imperial Russian Ballet. In addition to Fokine, all the different specialists for the new ballet company had also come from the Imperial Russian Ballet company. Initially, the Ballets Russes took advantage of the 3 months summer break when the Imperial ballet closed and its staff were free to do other things. The Ballets Russes used this time to stage their own ballets and operas in Paris. Diaghilev began looking around for an alternative to the style which Fokine customarily delivered before deciding to allow his senior male dancer, Vaslav Nijinsky, to try his hand at choreography.

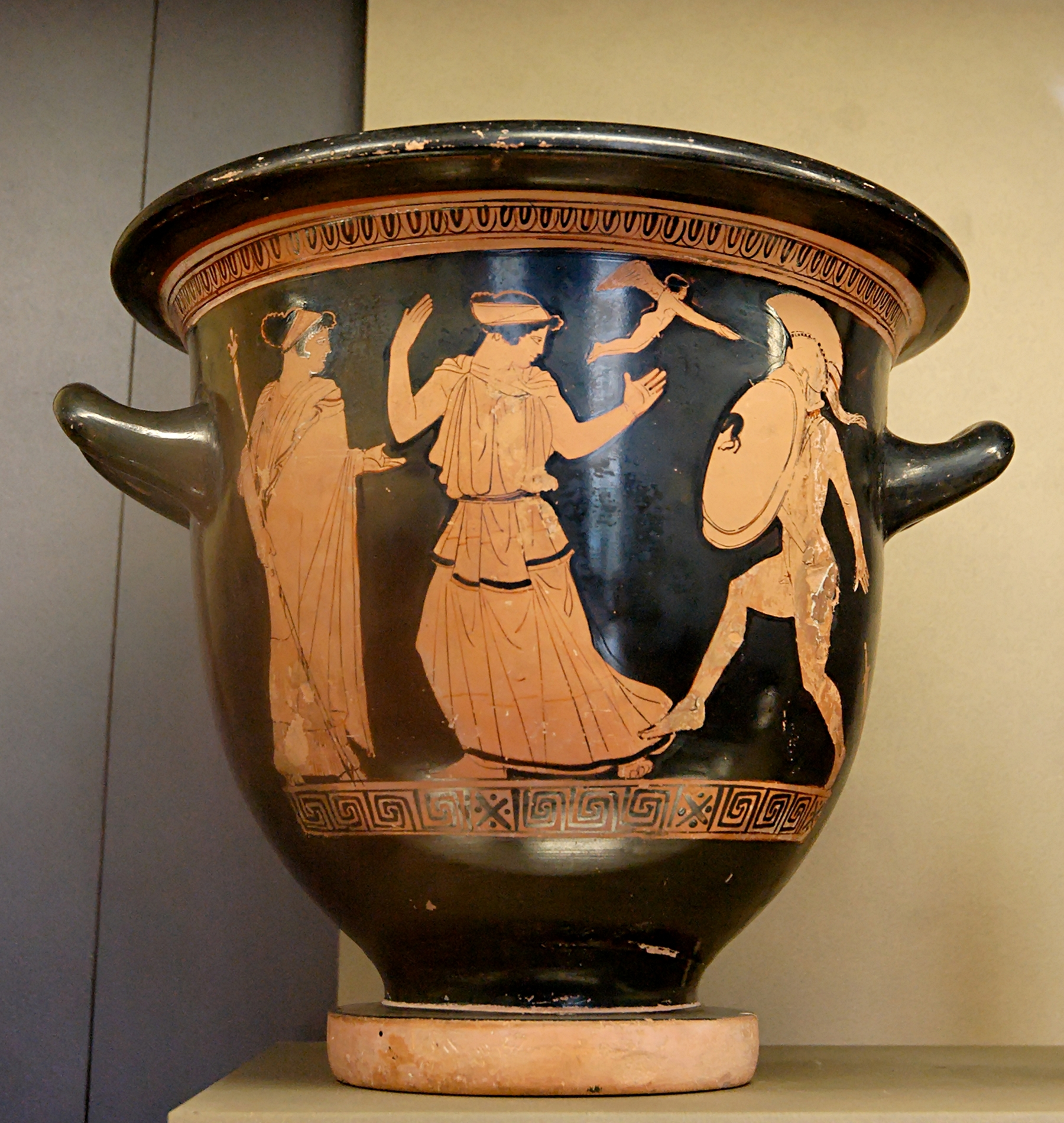
Menelaus intending to strike Helen is struck by her beauty instead. Louvre museum, Campana collection acquired 1861

Diaghilev, Nijinsky, and Bakst developed the original idea for The Afternoon of a Faun. The artwork on ancient Greek vases and Egyptian and Assyrian frescoes, which they viewed in the Louvre museum, was their source of inspiration. Bakst had previously worked with Vsevolod Meyerhold who was an innovative theatre producer and director that had introduced concepts like two-dimensionality, stylized postures, a narrow stage, and pauses and pacing to emphasise significant moments into his productions. Bakst, Nijinsky, and Diaghilev transferred these concepts to a ballet format in Faun. Nijinsky's aim was to reproduce the stylised look of the ancient artworks on the stage. In his portrayal of the faun, Nijinsky managed to reproduce exactly the figure of a satyr shown on Greek vases in the Louvre.

=== Development ===
Jean Cocteau, a French poet, explained the Mallarmé poem to Nijinsky who spoke little French, and helped develop an outline for the ballet's acts. Claude Debussy's symphonic poem, Prélude à l'après-midi d'un faune, was used for the orchestral music. After the summer season in Paris, Nijinsky returned to St Petersburg for the new Russian season. There, he began work on the choreography with the help of his sister, Bronislava Nijinska, who was herself a senior dancer. Bronislava would later choreograph her own ballets for the Ballets Russes.

Léon Bakst designed the stage setting which was more impressionist than representational. The splashes of muted greys, browns, and greens on the backcloth mirrored the fluid music, suggesting the scene rather than defining it precisely. It was hung at the line of the second wings rather than the back of the stage to deliberately narrow the performance space. The stage floorcloth was black as far back as the mound which the Faun lies upon. From there, it was green to the back of the stage. Baskt organized the lighting to emphasise the flattened look of the dance.

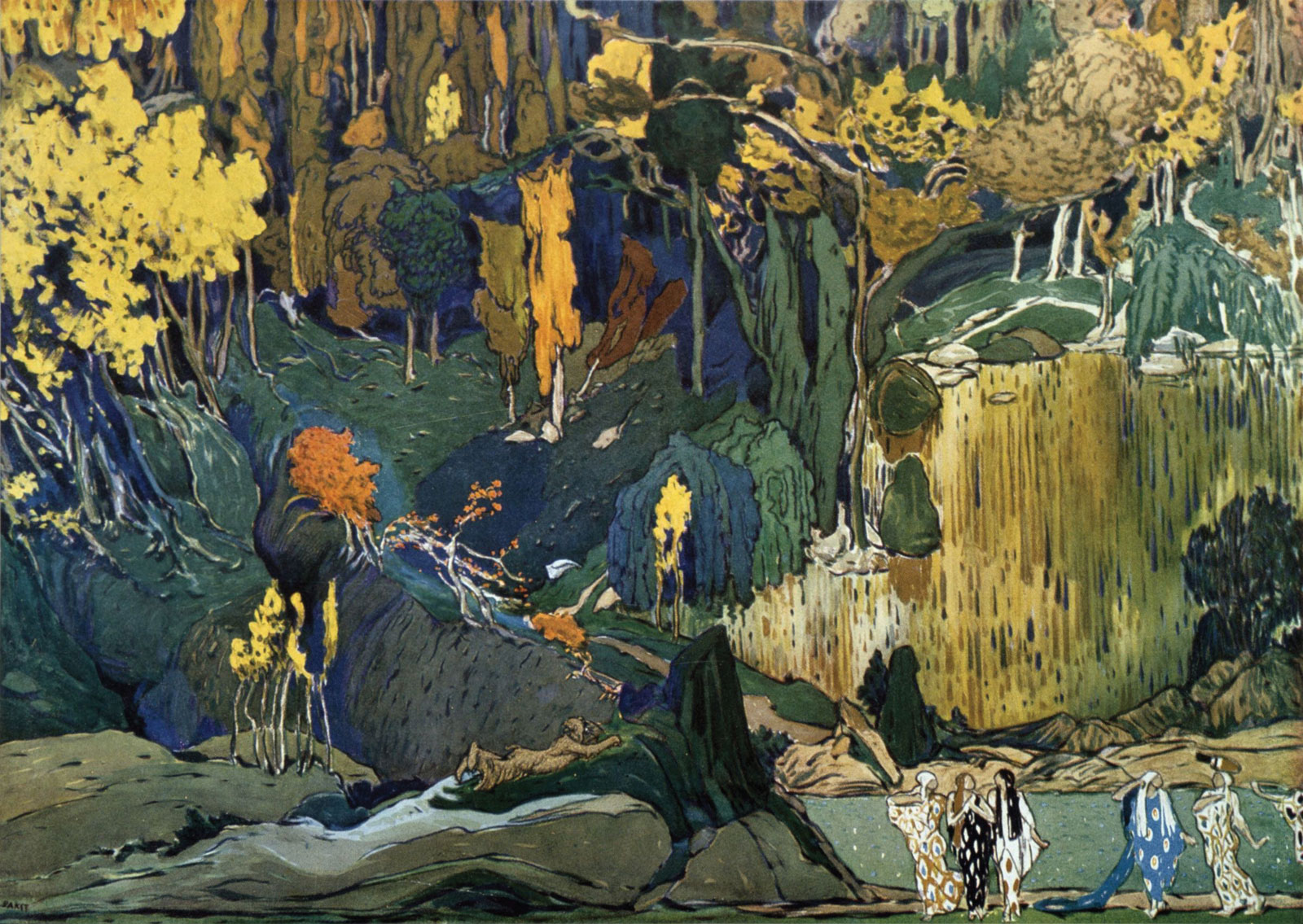
A design by Léon Bakst for the stage setting

The dancers' costumes were designed to stand out against the muted background. Nijinsky wore a cream body suit with brown piebald patches to represent the coat of an animal. His faun costume was completed with the addition of a short tail, a belt of vine leaves, and a cap of woven golden hair surrounding two golden horns which gave the impression of a circlet. Nijinsky's ears were extended with wax to look more pronounced and pointed while his makeup was designed to make his face appear more animal. The nymphs wore white muslin that was tailored into long pleated tunics and decorated with stencilled patterns in blue or rust red. Some tunics had checkered borders and others had wavy lines or leaves. The nymphs had little makeup, except that their eyes were painted in pale pink. They wore tight wigs of golden rope which hung down in long strands. The Faun and senior nymph wore golden sandals while the rest of the dancers had bare white feet with rouged toes.

=== Difficulties ===
Vaslav Nijinsky was an exceptional dancer but not an exceptional teacher. Nijinsky's sister notes in her memoir that, throughout the development of all his ballets, he had difficulty explaining to others what he needed them to do and operated through demonstration rather than explanation. Bronislava notes that Nijinsky ignored the gap in ability between the dancers he directed and his artistic vision for the choreography. Nijinsky had difficulty accepting the limitations of others, expecting them to be able to perform as well as he could. Bronislava acted as his guinea-pig, trying out dances and positions. She describes the experience as feeling as though Nijinsky were a sculptor and she the clay which he positioned through each step.

Nijinsky and his sister performed the partially developed work for Diaghilev and Bakst in St. Petersburg at the start of 1911. From the beginning, the ballet's development was kept secret until Diaghilev was ready to stage it, because he feared it would offend Fokine. The company was relying on Fokine for other ballets that were also in production, and thought that he might walk out if his position as undisputed choreographer to the company was challenged. The régisseur, Grigoriev, was let into the secret in early 1912. In March of the same year, rehearsals began with other members of the company. Fokine, who now knew about the project, resented the loss of rehearsal time for his own productions. He attacked Nijinsky's incompetence at getting across his own ideas, claimed he only had the job because he was Diaghilev's lover, and announced his intention to resign which confirmed Diaghilev's fears.

The 12-minute ballet required 90 rehearsals. This led to the reduction of time Fokine received with the dancers which was the basis for many of his complaints. All the dancers suffered the same difficulties Bronislava had reported in trying to adapt to the strange new movements. Nijinsky's choreography felt completely unnatural to them which lengthened the time they needed for training. By this time, Nijinsky had fully devised what he wanted each dancer to do, so he could focus on training them without having to work on developing the ballet at the same time. The general view amongst the dancers was that he was mad and the ballet was doomed to failure. Even Diaghilev started to have doubts and asked Nijinsky whether there might be changes to the difficult choreography. In response to this, Nijinsky threatened to resign.

== Choreography ==
Much of the movement takes place with groups of dancers passing each other in parallel lines, as if in a moving frieze. As the focus of attention passes from one group to another, dancers take a stylised pose, as might be seen on an ancient vase, and become still. The music is suggestive of a languorous summer's day in an exotic clime, and the dancers move steadily and languorously to match.

The Faun locks arms with the nymph

The ballet starts with the sound of a flute as the curtain rises to show the faun lying on his mound. The faun is supporting himself with his left arm while his right holds a flute to his lips. He then eats from first one and then another bunch of grapes, holding them to his face. The movements are stylised and angular, but are also suggestive of the movements of an animal. The flute music is then joined by horns and a rippling harp. As the flute tune repeats for the third time, three nymphs walk on from the left of the stage with synchronised, stylised movements. Then, two more nymphs, moving in unison but differently from the first group, join the other dancers onstage.

They perform a long arabesque to music from two flutes and a harp. These instruments are joined by strings as the music progresses while a sixth nymph walks to centre stage and holds a pose before joining the pair. The six nymphs freeze when the last nymph enters with a mechanical walk across the stage as she lets her outer veils fall to reveal a short golden garment beneath. The nymphs all begin to move. The tableau on the stage consists of a group of three, a group of two, and a single nymph who either dances with the pair to balance the scene or strikes poses at variance to the pair.

The faun remains motionless as the first six nymphs enter, but then he follows the progress of the last nymph with his eyes. A clarinet starts to play as his head begins to move, and he rises to his feet as a cello joins in. The six nymphs have begun to bathe the new arrival. Accompanied by an oboe, they move in and out, kneeling and rising with their elbows turned out from their sides as they keep their hands pointed at their waists or to the sky. Violins accompany an increase in tempo as the faun descends from his mound. The pair of nymphs depart to the left of the stage carrying one of the discarded veils while the first three nymphs carry off a second veil to the left. The music changes to a soulful clarinet solo. The sixth nymph who has been left isolated centre stage suddenly notices the faun behind her and runs off to the left, hands in air.

The faun and the last nymph are alone on stage as the music changes with a new air of excitement from the woodwind section which builds along with the violins and the harp. The faun approaches the nymph with bursts of movement, and the two dance around each other in a standoffish courting display. He executes his only jump in the ballet across an imagined stream issuing from a waterfall shown on the backdrop. The music becomes louder as the nymph becomes more enthusiastic. It subsides again as they link arms, but she breaks away and exits flat footed to the left. The faun watches her go in disappointment before smiling, then he turns back to her discarded veil. To a solo violin backed by horns, flute, and clarinet, the faun throws back his head and bares his teeth. Laughing, he takes the veil. He examines it with great delight as the harp and the flute repeat the opening melody.

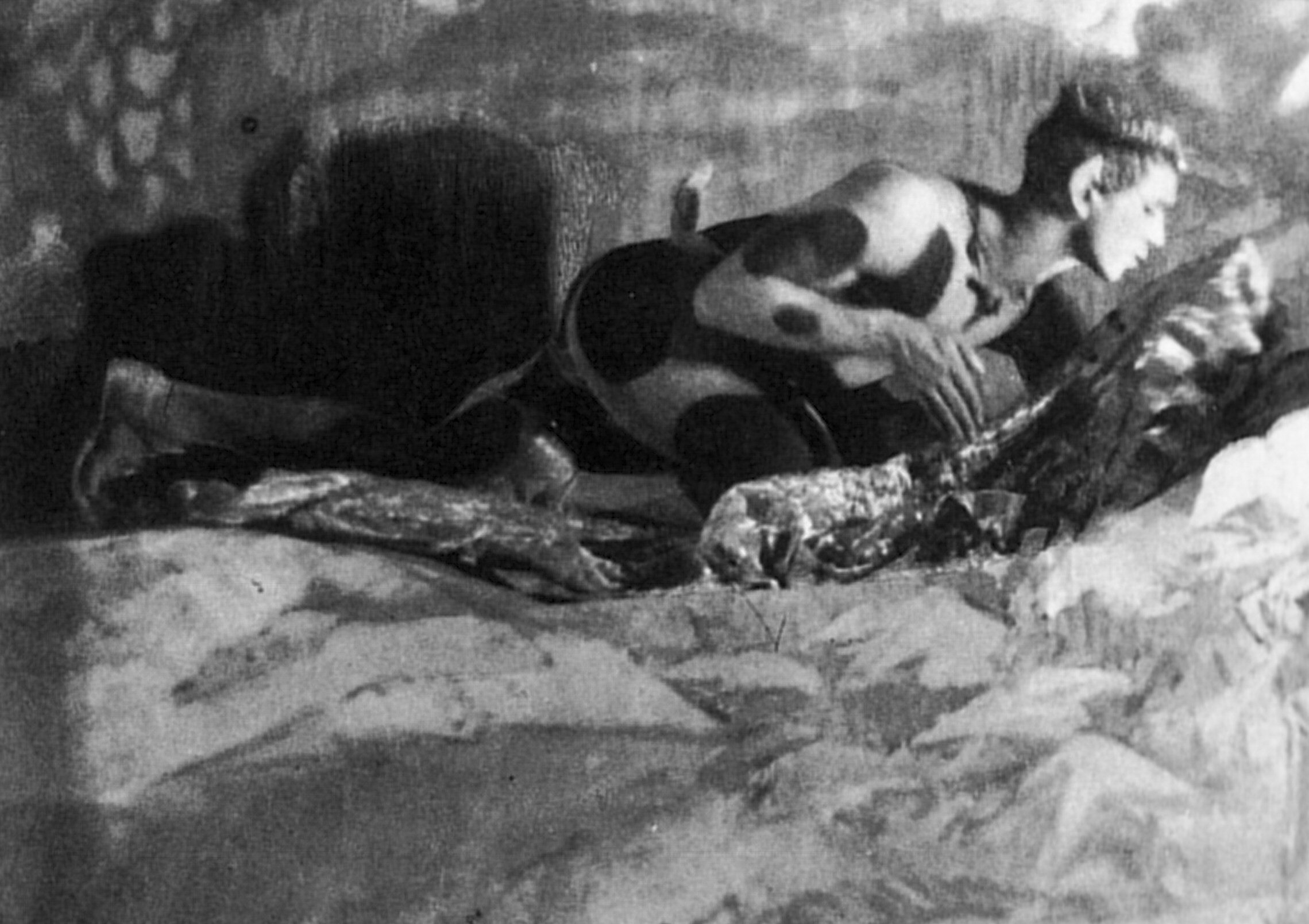
The faun starts to lie down on the nymph's veil

The woodwind brings in staccato chords as the three nymphs return from stage left to challenge the faun who falls back from their advance. The music changes with an oboe taking up the tune as the nymphs turn back offstage again with their hands in the air. The faun examines the veil, holding it in the air against his head until the cor anglais and flutes accompany the pair of nymphs as they enter from stage left. They again challenge the faun with flapping arms, and are followed by the lagging sixth nymph who dances the same challenge just as the pair turn to leave. The faun falls back, exchanging stares with the nymphs before the last nymph breaks off and she too retires. The faun is now alone. He nods his head over the veil and returns to his mound. A cello and flute carry the tune with the harp continuing in the background. The faun holds the veil to his face before spreading it on the ground and lowering his body onto it with his head tucked in and arms to his sides. Soft horns and a harp accompany a final flute passage as his body tenses and curls back, head rising, before relaxing back onto the veil.

Lydia Sokolova, the first English dancer in the Ballets Russes, described Nijinsky's performance as "thrilling." She highlighted his powerful, animalistic movements in his handling of the nymph's veil, and lauded his acting during this visceral scene.

== Performances ==
Nijinsky as the faun. Taken by Baron de Meyer who published a book of photographs of the ballet

=== Premiere and reaction ===
On 28 May 1912, an invited audience attended the dress rehearsal. There was silence as it finished. Gabriel Astruc, a French impresario who assisted Diaghilev with finance, publicity, and bookings, came on stage and announced that the ballet would be repeated. This time, there was some applause before the audience was presented champagne and caviar in the theatre foyer.

The Afternoon of a Faun was premiered on 29 May at the Théâtre du Châtelet in Paris. The faun was danced by Vaslav Nijinsky, senior nymph by Nelidova, and Bronislava Nijinska danced the 6th nymph. The conductor was Pierre Monteux. On the opening night, the ballet was met with a mixture of applause and booing, and again it was repeated. After the repeated performance, the audience applauded, and the sculptor, Auguste Rodin who was in the audience, stood up to cheer.

Comoedia published a long article by its editor, Gaston de Pawlowski, where he praised the ballet and supported articles by Louis Vuillemain and Louis Schneider. Vuillemain wrote that this ballet had the most pleasing acting, dancing, and music he had ever seen before. Le Théâtre carried a review by Schneider where he applauded Nijinsky's ability to accurately adapt his choreography to Debussy's composition.

A strikingly different response appeared in Le Figaro, where the editor, Gaston Calmette, also carried a front page article on the ballet. Calmette denounced the ballet after declining to publish the favourable report of his normal theatre critic, Robert Brussel. Calmette wrote that the ballet was not artful, imaginative, nor meaningful. He then goes on to criticize the choreography of the faun as being "filthy" and "indecent", which he argued deservedly incited the booing at the initial showings. Calmette was much more complimentary about Nijinsky's other performances that were part of the same evening's schedule as the showing of the Faun. He applauded Nijinsky in Le Spectre de la Rose, which Michel Fokine choreographed, and said that this was the kind of ballet that should be performed for the public.

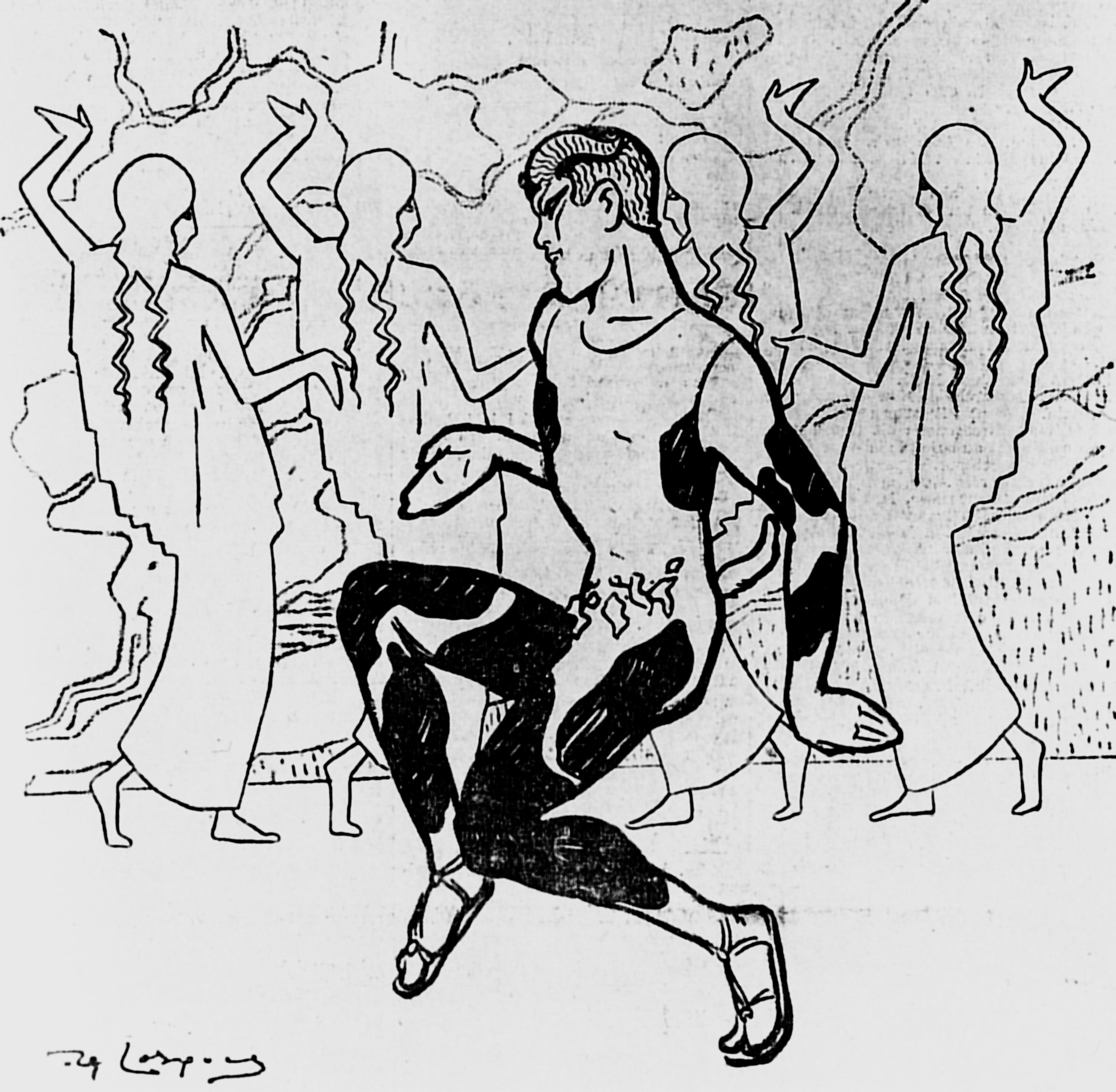
Cartoon by Daniel de Losques published in Le Figaro, 30 May 1912

Diaghilev responded to Calmette by forwarding letters of support to Le Figaro which they published the following day. The painter, Odilon Redon, a friend of Mallarmé, suggested how much the author of the original poem on which the ballet had been based would have approved: "more than anyone, he would have appreciated this wonderful evocation of his thoughts."

In another letter that Diaghilev submitted, Auguste Rodin wrote that Nijinsky's acting and attention to detail over the movements of his body worked wonderfully to convey the character and mind of the faun. Rodin noticed the antique forms of the frescoes and other art in Nijinsky's display. The artist expressed the feeling that Nijinsky was a sculptor's "ideal model."

The dispute over the ballet spread, taking on a political tone. Le Figaro was accused of attacking the Ballets Russes because they opposed France's political policy to ally with Russia, and that they represented an opening to smear all things Russian. The Russian ambassador became involved, French politicians signed petitions, and the President and Prime Minister asked a government commission to report. The Paris police attended the second night of the ballet because of its alleged obscenity, but took no action after they saw the public's support. The ending of the ballet may have been temporarily amended to be more proper. Tickets to all performances were sold out, and Parisians clamoured to obtain them by any means.

Michel Fokine claimed to be shocked by the explicit ending of Faun, despite at the same time suggesting that the idea of the faun lying down in a sexual manner on top of the nymph's veil had been plagiarised from his own ballet Tannhäuser. In this ballet, Fokine choreographed the hero to lie down in a comparable manner upon a woman. However, Fokine found some points to compliment in the ballet, including the use of pauses by the dancers where traditionally there would have been continuous movement, as well as the juxtaposition of angular choreography with the very fluid music.

Fokine's animosity to Faun is partly explainable by his own difficulties in preparing Daphnis and Chloe, which was to premiere the week following Faun but was not complete. Diaghilev tried to cancel Daphnis; instead it was postponed to 8 June. Daphnis only received two performances even though it was considered a success by critics such as Le Figaro. The company was sharply divided into two factions by the quarrel, some supporting Nijinsky and some Fokine. The final result consisted of Fokine leaving the company on bad terms with Nijinsky regardless of the fact that the partnership between Nijinsky as dancer and Fokine as choreographer had been enormously successful for them both.

=== Further performances by the Ballets Russes ===
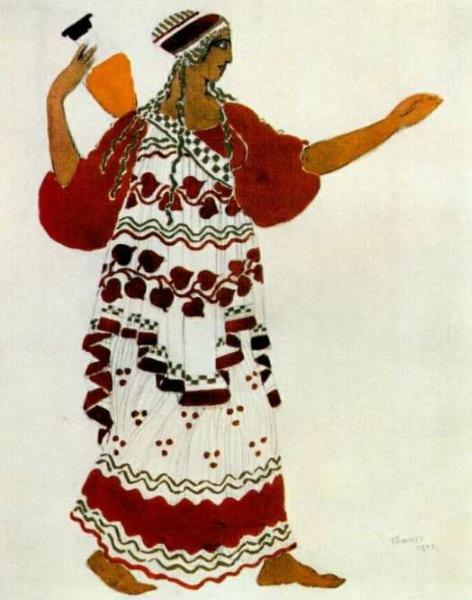
One of the designs by Bakst for nymph costumes

The Ballets Russes chose not to show Faun in the London season immediately following its Paris appearance. Instead, the company premiered L'Oiseau de feu, Narcisse, and Thamar for the first time in London. In the autumn, a German tour began at the Stadt-Theater in Cologne on 30 October before moving to the New Royal opera House in Berlin on 11 December. The Berlin programme included Faun which was performed before the Kaiser, the King of Portugal, and sundry dignitaries. Diaghilev reported to Astruc that this showing was a "huge success" which resulted in ten encores without protest. Serge Gregoriev, who had just resigned from the Mariinsky Theatre to join Diaghilev full-time as stage manager, was more sanguine, reporting that "faun fell flat," but he confirmed the overall success of the German tour.

In spring 1913, the ballet was performed in Vienna, where it again had a cool reception, though not so bad as Petrushka, which the orchestra of the Vienna Opera House initially refused to play because they disliked the music. The company returned to London, where the response was completely different and both ballets were well-received. During its first performance, there was some hissing in the audience, but the majority favoured it, and it received an encore once again. The Times described Nijinsky's performance as "extraordinarily expressive," and complimented the ballet on its ability to appeal to the audience in a way the public had never seen a ballet do before. Writing in the Daily Mail, music critic Richard Capell said, "The miracle of the thing lies with Nijinsky – the fabulous Nijinsky, the peerless dancer, who as the faun does no dancing." Capell goes on to praise his acting as well as the single leap which he deems an "illumination" of the faun's dichotomy between man and animal.

=== Later performances by other companies ===
In 1931, shortly after the death of Diaghilev, when some of his dancers settled in London, the Rambert Ballet took L'Après-midi d'un faune into its repertoire. Leon Woizikovsky, who had danced the faun in the last years of the Diaghilev company and whom Nijinsky taught, reproduced the ballet for Rambert's company. Rambert Ballet revived Faun for several years. The reproduction met with criticism from Cyril Beaumont who commented in his book that the ballet becomes “meaningless, if given, as sometimes happens, without the essential nymphs.”

At the Nureyev Festival at the London Coliseum in July 1983, Rudolf Nureyev danced the faun as part of a Homage to Diaghilev in a mixed bill of ballets. Then, in the late 1980s, dance notation specialists Ann Hutchinson Guest and Claudia Jeschke reconstructed the ballet from Nijinsky's own notebooks, his dance notation, and the photographs of the dancers that Baron Adolph de Meyer produced shortly after the original performance of the ballet. This reconstructed version is often presented alongside Nijinsky's other works or repertoire from the Ballets Russes.

== Other art ==
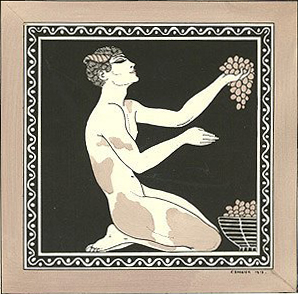
George Barbier, Nijinsky as the Faun, 1913

Lita Grey Chaplin, the second wife of Charlie Chaplin, notes in her memoir that the nymph dance in the dream sequence of the Chaplin film Sunnyside (1919) was a tribute to the ballet as well as to Nijinsky whom the filmmaker had met two years prior.

A pastiche of the ballet forms part of the music video for Queen's 1984 single I Want to Break Free. Freddie Mercury dances the role of the faun, with dancers from the Royal Ballet also performing, including Jeremy Sheffield. This version also proved controversial in the US.

== See also ==
- List of ballets by title

== Bibliography ==
- Buckle, Richard (1971). Nijinsky. The Trinity Press. ISBN 0297-00452-2.
- Caddy, Davinia (2012). The Ballets Russes and Beyond: Music and Dance in Belle-Époque Paris. Cambridge university press. ISBN 978-1-107-01440-4.
- Ostwald, Peter (1991). Vaslav Nijinsky, a leap into madness. London: Robson Books Ltd. ISBN 978-0-86051-711-5.
- de Meyer, Adolf (1914). L'après-midi d'un faune. Paris.
- de Meyer, Adolf (1983). L'après-midi d'un faune : Nijinsky, 1912 : thirty-three photographs. London: Dance Books Ltd. ISBN 0-903102-78-1.
- Parker, Derek (1988). Nijinsky: God of the Dance. Wellingborough, England: Thorsons Publishing Group. ISBN 1-85336-032-5.
