= Alexander Goldstein =

American film director (born 1948)

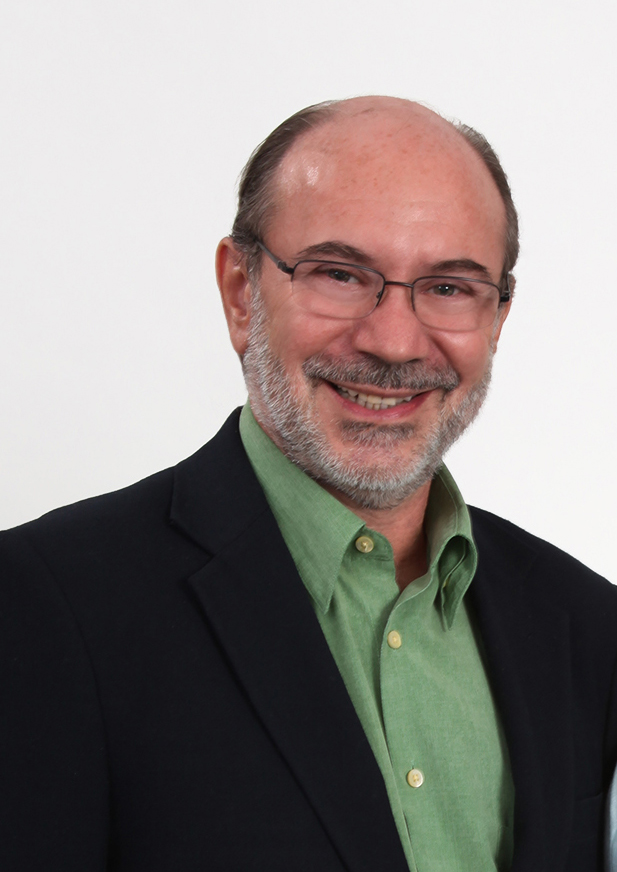
- Alexander Goldstein Music Composer
- Born: August 10, 1948 (age 77); Moscow, USSR
- Education: The Gnessin School of Music
- Occupations: Film director, film producer, music composer
- Years active: 1976–present
- Website: AlexanderGoldstein.com

Alexander Goldstein (born August 10, 1948), also credited as Aleksandr Goldshteyn and Aleksandr Goldstein in films, is a Russian–American music composer, conductor, songwriter, record producer, film producer, director, editor and is the founder of ABG World and SportMusic.com. He was born in Moscow, USSR, into a family of Bolshoi Theater Orchestra musicians.

== Biography ==
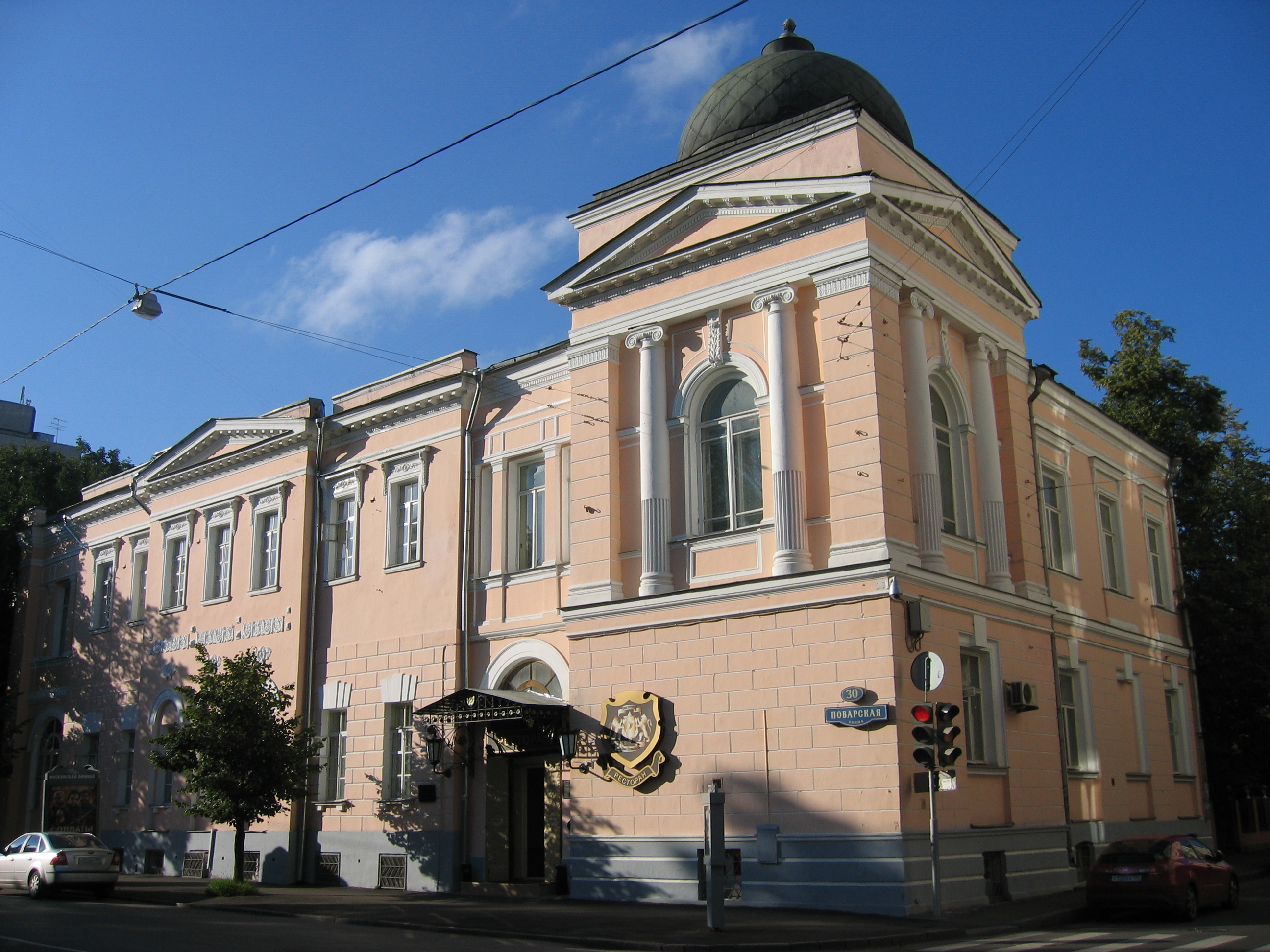
Gnessin State Musical College

He is the son of Boris Goldstein, a French Horn player of the Bolshoi Orchestra and nephew of Lev Goldstein, a French Horn player of the Red Army Theater. At the age of 6, he began his studies at one of the most prestigious music educational centers in the world, The Gnessin School of Music in Moscow. 16 years later, he completed his music education by graduating at The Gnessin Academy of Music with a master's degree in conducting and French horn. He started composing music in 1976 in Moscow. Following perestroika, Alexander moved to the US and was granted citizenship.

== Career ==
Mr. Goldstein composed music scores for 26 feature films, 2 silent classics, approximately 300 documentary films, animations, countless radio and television shows, circus and stage shows, commercials, and sports programs in the US and abroad. Over his career as a sport music editor and arranger, Alexander Goldstein has worked with athletes and coaches from 20 countries and helped hundreds of National competition participants spanning 4 different continents. 51 Olympic Individual and Team Medals and over 125 World Medals were won using the music that he either edited or arranged.

After moving to New York City, he became Executive Producer and Creative Director at WMNB and EABC in Fort Lee, NJ.

== Films and music ==
Alexander Goldstein formed his own Video and Audio Production Company, ABG World. In 1997 he composed original music scores for documentary films Six Days, Vasya, about the life of a Russian painter Vasily Sitnikov, whose works are in the New York Museum of Modern Art (MoMA) and Konstantin and Mouse, a 2006 film about Russian performance poet Konstantin Kuzminsky, all directed by Andrei Zagdansky. Alexander wrote original music scores and worked as video editor on 15 films produced by AY Associates for the US State Department. Among those films are Silk Road Festival, Energy, One Year Later, Alaska, Gagarin and Gore-Bush. Alexander edited 50 television shows and Progulki po Broadveiu (Broadway Walks) for TV Channel Kultura Russian Federation and 125 shows of Time Out TV show hosted by Oleg Frish, which aired on NTV (America) from 2005 to 2010 and featured memorable exclusive interviews and performances of such American music greats as Paul Anka, Peter Cincotti, James Brown, Connie Francis, Gloria Gaynor, Donna Summer and Russian performers who frequented USA like Valeri Leoniev or call it home like Yakov Smirnoff

Alexander Goldstein relocated to Naples, Florida in 2005 and continues to produce documentary films and compose music. Notably, during the first production of Kings of the Dance in 2006 with classical ballet stars Ethan Stiefel and Angel Corella of American Ballet Theatre, Nikolay Tsiskaridze of the Bolshoi Ballet and Johan Kobborg of the Royal Danish Ballet – arguably the four strongest male principals dancers at the time, Alexander created a film about the dancers, which opened the performances at the Orange County Performing Arts Center (CA) and the New York City's City Center. This production was followed by Kings of The Dance II in 2008 and We Got It Good in 2010. Both films received Videographer Awards. Alexander Goldstein directed, filmed and edited all three films for Ardani Artists Management.

In 2008, Alexander Goldstein directed and produced for Telechannel Russia a documentary film Ascension from Olympus, about Bobrin's Ice Theatre headed by European Champion Igor Bobrin and Olympic Champion Natalia Bestemianova. "Bobrin's Ice Theatre became the very first ice theatre to invite composers to create music specifically for dramatic ice performances and many prominent modern Russian composers contributed their talent – Michail Chekalin, Alexander Gradsky, Alexander Rosenblat, Alexander Goldstein and others."

In Russia, Alexander Goldstein is known for his expertise on the music of Paul Mauriat, a renowned French orchestra leader who has an official fan club. During First International Paul Mauriat Festival, which concluded in March 2015, Alexander Goldstein chaired the jury.

Alexander used Paul Mauriat's original instrumental recording of "Alouette" as music for opening animation sequence to the popular TV program "In the world of animals" (V mire zhivotnykh) for Soviet TV channel that aired in USSR and Russia for over 30 years.

Nu, Pogodi! music supervision of episodes 7 thru 14 was done by Alexander Goldstein and the fan club in Russian Federation has referred to him to clarify Nu, Pogodi music mysteries, which surface now and then, most of which caused by the Soviet-era music source misstatements.

In 2021, Alexander composed documentary film score for Peter Mostovoy's autobiographical film The Red Scarf, which premiered on Israeli TV.

== Orchestra and chamber music ==
In 2010, Alexander Goldstein composed Rotissimo, a Suite for Clarinet, Violin and String Orchestra, after film music of the immortal Italian film composer Nino Rota. World premiere of Rotissimo was in October 2011 in Toronto by the Canadian Sinfonietta. Rotissimo had its European Debut at Sibelius Academy, Helsinki, Finland: in 2012 Päivyt Meller, Violin and Julian Milkis, Clarinet. In 2017 Rotissimo had its Russian premiere at the State Academic Capella of Saint Petersburg, with Sergey Dogadin, Violin and Julian Milkis, Clarinet. In subsequent years, Maestro Goldstein created an additional version of Rotissimo for Violin, Cello and String Orchestra. It was performed in Russia and US.

In 2013 Alexander Goldstein's Trio on the Roof made its debut at the Eastman School of Music University of Rochester, performed by Kenneth Grant (clarinet), Mikhail Kopelman (violin) and Elizaveta Kopelman (piano). This composition was performed many times since in US and Europe.

In 2015 Mr. Goldstein composed Neapolitan Symphony, a sometimes flirtatious, sometimes pensive work, inspired by the Neapolitan Dance from Tchaikovskiy's Swan Lake World premiere of Neapolitan Symphony was on December 1, 2016, in Bursa, Turkey by Sinfoni Orchestrati, conducted by Mikhail Kirchhoff.

In 2017 Mr. Goldstein completed Introspective Trio. It premiered in 2019 in Arlington, VA by National Chamber Ensemble, Leo Shushansky, artistic director.

Also composed in 2017 was Rhapsody on the Theme of Albinoni. It premiered in Khazan, Tatarstan by Primavera Chamber Orchestra with Rustem Abyazov, Violin, (Russia) and Mark Drobinsky, Cello (France).

Also in 2017 Mr. Goldstein composed nostalgic "Romancing the Eyes," inspired by the ultra popular Ochi Chornye romance, performed by Alexandra Carlson.

In 2018, Maestro Goldstein composed Amarcord Variations for Clarinet Solo.

In 2020 Mr. Goldstein composed a cycle of Russian Romances to poems from "One-way Correspondence", a book of poetry by Marina Berkovich. Some of these romances premiered in Moscow in 2021, at Leo Tolstoy's Home-Museum, performed by Victoria Dmitrieva-Goldstein (no relation).

In 2021 Maestro Goldstein composed Symphonic Poem To Be Or Not To Be to Hamlet's soliloquy by William Shakespeare.

In 2022 Maestro Goldstein composed The Beauty Of Ostinato for String Orchestra and Bass Guitar.

In 2023 Maestro Goldstein composed Forward To The Past for Two Violins and Pipe Organ.

In 2024 Maestro Goldstein composed On The Wings Of Classics, Concerto for Violin and String Orchestra.

In 2025 Maestro Goldstein composed In Classical Eden, Concerto for Soprano, Flute, and Chamber Orchestra.

== Filmography ==
Alexander Goldstein composed music scores for 26 feature films including:

- 2009 Attrakzion (TV mini-series)
- 1992 Love in Moscow
- 1991 Nomer Luks dlya Generala s Devochkoi
- 1991 Oblako-ray
- 1990 Neotstreliannaya Muzyka
- 1990 Vybor
- 1990 Yego zhena kuritsa
- 1990 Vanka-vstanka
- 1989 Zhena kerosinshchika
- 1989 Ya v polnom poryadke
- 1988 Bomzh (Bez opredelyonnogo mesta zhitelstva)
- 1987 Staraya azbuka
- 1987 Muzykalnaya Smena
- 1986 Chelovek s akkordeonom
- 1986 Veruyu v lyubov
- 1985 Bereg
- 1982 Assol
- 1981 Ozhidaetsa Poholodania i Sneg
- 1979 Tut, Nedaleko...

Alexander Goldstein composed music scores for two silent classics of world cinema:

- 1928 Storm Over Asia by Vsevolod Pudovkinmusic score composed 1985
- 1926 The Case of Three Million by Yakov Protazanov music score composed 1987

Alexander Goldstein composed music scores for animations and approximately 300 documentaries including:

- 2021 The Red Scarf
- 2007 Orange Winter
- 2006 Konstantin and Mouse
- 2005 Silk Road Festival
- 2005 USA – Russia Star Wars
- 2002 Vasya
- 2002 Energy
- 2002 One Year Later
- 2001 Six Days
- 2001 Gagarin
- 2000 Gore – Bush
- 2000 Alaska
- 1989 Mir vam, Sholom
- 1985 Lyubov Orlova
- 1984 Alhimik
- 1983 Devochka i piraty
- 1983 Myshonok i koshka
- 1982 Volshcbinoe Lekarstvo
- 1981 Prihodi Na Katok

Alexander Goldstein performed music editing and music supervising for animations and documentaries including:

- 1996 Spheres
- 1979 Que Viva Mexico (music supervision)
- 1977–1984 Nu, pogodi! Episodes 7–14 (music supervision)
- 1975 In the World of Animals (music supervision)

Alexander Goldstein directed and edited films, documentaries, television shows and animations including:

- 2023 Southwest Florida Jewish Pioneers: Michael Mendelsohn, Midsummer Night Dream
- 2022 Southwest Florida Jewish Pioneers: Jack Nortman, Boxcar Education Giant
- 2021 Southwest Florida Jewish Pioneers: Sheldon Starman, Down The Memory Line
- 2021 Southwest Florida Jewish Pioneers: Gene Goodman, The Song Meister
- 2021 Southwest Florida Jewish Pioneers: Mayor With A Heart
- 2020 Southwest Florida Jewish Pioneers: Florence Hertzman, By The Pier
- 2020 Southwest Florida Jewish Pioneers: Irving Berzon, Engineering The Future
- 2019 Southwest Florida Jewish Pioneers: Chief Plager
- 2019 Southwest Florida Jewish Pioneers: Judith and Samuel Friedland, The Power of Two
- 2018 Southwest Florida Jewish Pioneers: Greensteins of Marco Island
- 2018 Southwest Florida Jewish Pioneers: Elena Rosner, When Destiny Called
- 2018 Southwest Florida Jewish Pioneers: Murray Hendel, Murray's Mile
- 2017 Southwest Florida Jewish Pioneers: The Labodas of Fort Myers
- 2017 Southwest Florida Jewish Pioneers: Stuart Kaye, A Mench for All Reasons
- 2016 We Testify: Hidden Children, produced for the Holocaust Museum of Southwest Florida
- 2015 Southwest Florida Jewish Pioneers: Richard Segalman, The Man and His Art
- 2015 Southwest Florida Jewish Pioneers: Gloria Lipman-Goldberg and Bill Lipman, Two of The 6L's
- 2015 Southwest Florida Jewish Pioneers: Helen Weinfeld
- 2014 We Testify: Testimony to Truth, produced for the Holocaust Museum of Southwest Florida
- 2013 Naples, Florida: Redefining Paradise
- 2011 Naples Oral Histories: If These Walls Could Talk, produced for Naples Historical Society
- 2010 We Got It Good
- 2009 Kings of the Dance II
- 2008 Voshozhdenie s Olimpa
- 2006 Kings of the Dance (Named by New York Magazine as top 10 cultural events of 2006)
- 2005 Well Done (TV Show, 2 27-minute episodes)
- 2005 Time Out (TV Show 121 27-minute episodes)
- 2005–2002 Progulki po Broadway (TV Show 50 26-minute episodes)
- 2002 Gariki I Cheloveki (5-part documentary)

== SportMusic ==
Alexander is Merit Coach of Figure Skating Federation of Russia and collaborated with such coaches as: Elena Tchaikovskaia, Tatiana Tarasova, Tamara Moskvina, Stanislav Zhuk, Alexei Mishin, Igor Moskvin, Natalia Dubova, Lyudmila Pakhomova, Irina Rodnina, Edouard Pliner, Nikolai Morozov, Robin Wagner, Igor Shpilband and Marina Zoueva. Leading into 1980 Summer Olympics in Moscow, Alexander Goldstein was instrumental in converting live piano accompaniment of gymnastics floor exercise to audio tape recording. Together with Lyudmila Pakhomova, Alexander established a music training program for coaches at GITIS Russian Academy of Theater Arts. He has created such unforgettable ice dance music programs as La Cumparsita for Liudmila Pakhomova and Alexander Gorshkov, Polovtsian Dances for Natalia Bestemianova and Andrei Bukin, and popularized western music in the USSR during the Cold War by using such pop songs as: Afric Simone's Hafanana for Marina Cherkasova and Sergei Shakhrai, and Louis Armstrong's rendition of What a Wonderful World. He has created music arrangements for 10-time Canadian National Figure Skating Champions Shae-Lynn Bourne and Victor Kraatz, and Bulgarian World Figure Skating Champions Albena Denkova and Maxim Staviski based on Tomaso Albinoni's Adagio.

- 2007-2008 skating season Hip Hawk was composed by Alexander Goldstein based on Swan Lake by Pyotr Tchaikovsky and choreographed by Nikolai Morozov for Daisuke Takahashi of Japan, introducing Hip hop music genre to competitive figure skating and creating a new trend.

In Elena Tchaikovskaia's 1986 book titled "Figure Skating", she is quoted saying: (translated)

Alexander Goldstein created dozens, even hundreds of brilliant musical compositions. They were different in nature, but always brought a profound aesthetic pleasure to the performers, coaches and millions of viewers. I have no doubt that readers of all ages have heard at least once, songs of Alexander Goldstein performed by L. Pakhomova, A. Gorshkov, A. Zaitsev, N. Linichuk, G. Karponossov, V. Kovalev and many of our other top skaters.

Alexander Goldstein Category A figure skating coach in USA and Merit Coach of Russian Federation. Over 40 Individual Olympic medals were won with Alexander Goldstein's music services.

== SportMusic.com Label CD and Digital Releases ==
- 2025 Goldstein Original Series digital albums
- 2017-2025 published nearly 200 digital albums
- 2017 Waltz for Paul Mauriat
- 2014 Ice Water Floor, The Twisted Classics Collection
- 2011 Figure Skating Classics

== Awards ==
Alexander received 5 Telly Awards for his work, including 2015 Siver TELLY Awards for WE TESTIFY: Testimony to Truth, Telly Awards for Naples Oral Histories: "If These Walls Could Talk" and for "Naples, Florida REDEFINING PARADISE," :Southwest Florida Jewish Pioneers: Richard Segalman," Videographer Awards for "We Got It Good" and "Kings of the Dance II", AVA Platinum Award for "Naples Oral Histories: 'If These Walls Could Talk", Choice Star Award from Naples Daily News, Hermes Awards for "Naples, Florida REDEFINING PARADISE" and "Because Someone Believed in Me". Many films that included Alexander's participation were awarded State Prize and USSR and International film festival awards in various countries.
