= Guillaume Côté =

Canadian ballet dancer

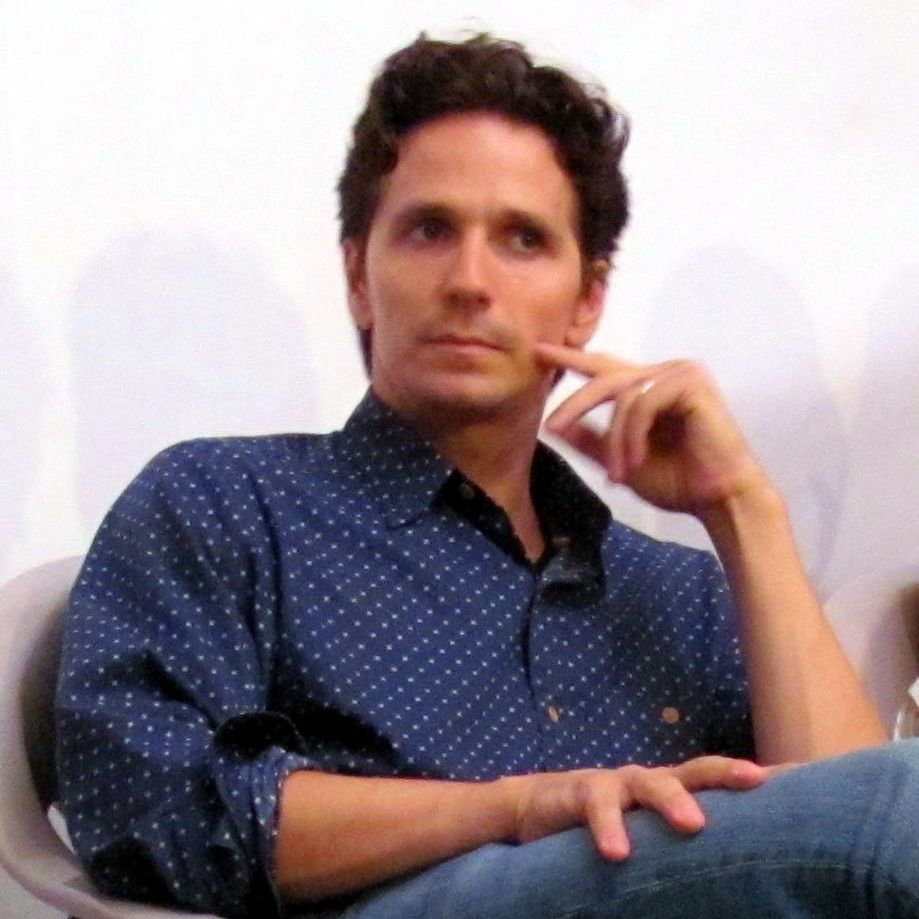
- Born: September 17, 1981 (age 45); Lac Saint-Jean, Quebec, Canada
- Education: Canada's National Ballet School
- Occupations: ballet dancer; choreographer
- Years active: 1998-2025
- Spouse: Heather Ogden (m. 2010; div. 2022)
- Children: 2
- Dancing career
- Current group: National Ballet of Canada Côté Danse

Guillaume Côté CQ (born September 17, 1981) is a Canadian ballet dancer, choreographer, composer and artistic director. He is a principal dancer and a Choreographic Associate at the National Ballet of Canada. In February 2024, he announced that the 2024/2025 season will be his last season before retirement. He has been the Artistic Director of the Festival des Arts de Saint-Sauveur since 2014 and is the Artistic Director of Côté Danse.

== Early life ==
Côté was born in Lac-à-la-Croix, a small town in the region of Lac Saint-Jean, in the province of Quebec, Canada. The municipality was since merged with Métabetchouan. His parents, René Côté and Germaine Tremblay, were both teachers with a passion for the arts. René plays the piano and Germaine convinced teacher friends Marie-Claire Bouchard and France Proulx to cofound a ballet school in Saint-Bruno,_Quebec to facilitate access to artistic training in their remote part of the country. In 1970, Le Prisme culturel was born. At the age of three, Guillaume took his first dance lessons there, along with his older sister Geneviève and several cousins. He stood out for his skills and was encouraged to take summer courses and then audition. At the age of 10, a trip to Montreal organised by Le Prisme Culturel enabled him to see his first ballet on stage: Fernand Nault's The Nutcracker, produced by Les Grands Ballets Canadiens.

=== Education ===
At age 11, despite not speaking English, Guillaume Côté entered Canada's National Ballet School in Toronto, where he trained from 1994 to 1999. His teachers included Sergiu Stefanschi, Reginald Amatto, Mavis Staines, Lindsay Fischer, Peggy Baker and Christopher House. He received additional training at the summer School of the Hamburg Ballet in 1998 where he worked directly with John Neumeier and many other renowned European teachers. In 1999, he had an internship at The School of American Ballet, which is the associate school of the New York City Ballet. He studied Balanchine style with Peter Boal, Jock Soto and Peter Martins.

== Career ==
=== National Ballet of Canada ===
In 1998, at age 17, Côté joined the National Ballet of Canada as an apprentice. At age 19, he made his debut as Prince Siegfried in Swan Lake, making him the youngest person in the company to dance that role. In 2001, he danced Romeo in Romeo and Juliet. In 2004, at age 23, Côté became a principal dancer. His repertoire include The Sleeping Beauty and John Neumeier's Nijinsky. He had originated the role Romeo in Alexei Ratmansky's version of Romeo and Juliet. Côté celebrated his 20th anniversary at the National Ballet in 2019, after a performance of Apollo. On June 18, 2023, Guillaume Côté bid a permanent farewell to the role of Romeo on The Four Seasons Centre's stage. Dancing Juliet for the first time of her career, special guest artist Sara Mearns was his partner.

In February 2024, Côté announced that the upcoming 2024/2025 season will be his last season with the company, as he will be retiring from dancing in 2025.

=== Guest Artist ===
"Dramatic and athletic, with an ability to jump as though his feet are equipped with hidden springs, it's not hard to figure out why Côté has been asked to guest perform with many of the best ballet companies on the planet." (National Post)

As a guest artist, Côté had performed with La Scala Theatre Ballet, English National Ballet, The Royal Ballet, American Ballet Theatre, The Hamburg Ballet and Stuttgart Ballet, as well as in Kings of the Dance, The Vision of Manuel Legris and Roberto Bolle and Friends. With English National Ballet, he originated the role of Gene Kelly in Strictly Gershwin. On December 15, 2018, Côté was invited to dance Alexei Ratmansky's Romeo and Juliet with Evgenia Obraztsova and the Bolshoi Ballet in Moscow, making him the first dancer from Quebec and one of the few Canadians to have danced on that stage. After the performance, Guillaume Côté was interviewed by CBC/Radio-Canada's reporter Tamara Alteresco and reflected on the experience he qualifies as one of the highlights of his career. In 2020, he made his debut at the New York City Ballet, dancing Swan Lake with Sara Mearns, in order to replace an injured Tyler Angle. The verdict? "from his mime to his partnering, he was a class act" (Gia Kourlas, The New York Times).

=== Kings of the Dance ===
Produced by Sergei Danilian, "Kings of the Dance" was an all-star showcase of male ballet dancing that toured internationally between 2007 and 2012. "The evening consists not of gala showstoppers but instead of a thoughtful collection of pieces, mostly solos, including a few gems." (The New Yorker).

The show offered an assortment of repertoire pieces and works by Nacho Duato, Christopher Wheeldon, Roland Petit, Marco Goecke and Marcelo Gomes, among others. Guillaume Côté was part of a cohort that included José Manuel Carreño, Marcelo Gomes, David Hallberg, Leonid Sarafanov, Nikolay Tsiskaridze and Ivan Vassiliev. "It is a pleasure to watch some of the most talented artists in the world." (Bachtrack).

In Kings of the Dance, Guillaume Côté performed Four Four by Christopher Wheeldon and Pas de deux by Roland Petit in Costa Mesa and at the Dorothy Chandler Pavilion in Los Angeles. He also danced Jazzy Five by Mauro Bigonzetti, Tue by Marco Goecke and KO'd by Marcelo Gomes, at the New York City Centre, the London Coliseum, the Mikhailovsky Theatre in Saint Petersburg, as well as in Novossibirsk, Riga, Rostov and Buenos Aires.

=== Body of work ===
"Respected internationally for his outstanding musicality, technique and dramatic interpretation", Guillaume Côté has performed the main roles in the classical repertoire and may hold some sort of record for Swan Lake, having danced versions by seven choreographers: James Kudelka, Peter Martins after Petipa, Mikhail Messerer, Vladimir Bourmeister, Patrice Bart, Derek Deane and Mario Galizzi. Côté also has extensive experience in neoclassical and contemporary works. "Much as he possesses a stage Côté also loves the studio – he describes himself as 'a crazy rehearsal freak' – and being part of the creation of new work is what excites him most". French critic Antonellla Poli wrote: "Guillaume Côté, star of the National Ballet of Canada, is unique: his talent, crystal-clear intelligence, ease on stage, musicality and artistic sensibility make him exceptional".

Guillaume Côté danced the following works:

- 24 Préludes de Chopin (Marie Chouinard)
- A Month in the Country (Frederick Ashton)
- A Streetcar named Desire (John Neumeier)
- Alice's Adventures in Wonderland (Christopher Wheeldon)
- An Italian Straw Hat (James Kudelka)
- Anna Karenina (John Neumeier)
- Apollo (George Balanchine)
- Bernstein Dances (John Neumeier)
- Black Night's Bright Day (James Kudelka)
- Carmen (Davide Bombana)
- Chaconne (James Kudelka)
- Chopper (Matjash Mrozewski)
- Cinderella (James Kudelka)
- Concerto (Kenneth MacMillan)
- Contract (James Kudelka)
- Coppelia (Roland Petit)
- Cruel World (James Kudelka)
- Crypto (Guillaume Côté)
- Danza delle ore / Dance of the Hours (Gheorghe Iancu)
- X (DIX) (Guillaume Côté)
- Don Quixote (Fischer & Krasnova, after Beriozoff, Petipa & Gorsky)
- Emergence (Crystal Pite)
- Four Four (Christopher Wheeldon)
- Giselle (Peter Wright)
- Grand Pas Classique (Victor Gsovsky)
- Hamlet (Kevin O'Day)
- Hamlet (Guillaume Côté-Robert Lepage)
- Incontri (Kristian Cellini)
- In Peril (Sabrina Matthews)
- Jazzy Five (Mauro Bigonzetti)
- Jewels (George Balanchine)
- KO'd (Marcelo Gomes)
- La Traviata (Veronica Paeper)
- Le Chant du compagnon errant (Maurice Béjart)
- Le Corsaire (Anna Marie Holmes)
- Le Spectre de la Rose (Marco Goecke)
- Les Sylphides (Magdalena Popa after Michel Fokine)
- Manon (Kenneth MacMillan)
- Marguerite and Armand (Frederick Ashton)
- Nijinsky (John Neumeier)
- Onegin (John Cranko)
- Opus 19 - The Dreamer (Jerome Robbins)
- Papillon (Ronald Hynd)
- Paquita (Marius Petipa)
- Pas de deux (Roland Petit)
- Petite mort (Jiří Kylián)
- Pink Floyd Ballet (Roland Petit)
- Polyphonia (Christopher Wheeldon)
- Préludes CV (John Neumeier)
- Proust, Les intermittences du cœur (Roland Petit)
- Raymonda (d'après Petipa)
- Romeo and Juliet (Alexei Ratmansky)
- Russian Seasons (Alexei Ratmansky)
- Serenade (George Balanchine)
- Soul (Jera Wolfe)
- Stravinsky Violin Concerto (George Balanchine)
- Strictly Gershwin (Derek Deane)
- Swan Lake (James Kudelka, Peter Martins, Mikhail Messerer, Vladimir Bourmeister, Patrice Bart, Derek Deane, Mario Galizzi)
- Symphony in C (George Balanchine)
- Tchaikovsky Pas de Deux (George Balanchine)
- The Calm Below (Roberto Campanella)
- The Dream (Frederick Ashton)
- The End (James Kudelka)
- The Four Seasons (James Kudelka)
- The Merry Widow (Ronald Hynd)
- The Nutcracker (James Kudelka)
- The Seagull (John Neumeier)
- The Sleeping Beauty (Rudolf Nureyev)
- The Taming of the Shrew (John Cranko)
- The Winter's Tale (Christopher Wheeldon)
- Theme and Variation (George Balanchine)
- Tué (Marco Goecke)
- Two of us (Marcelo Gomes)
- West Side Story Suite (Jerome Robbins)
- Yondering (John Neumeier)

== Choreographic work ==
"Music can get very loud, but dance is very fragile. It's ephemeral. It's a play on geometry, space, and emotion." - Guillaume Côté

Guillaume Côté was appointed Choreographic Associate of the National Ballet in 2013. He had choreographed a number of one-act ballets for the company. He won the Audience Choice Award at the Erik Bruhn Prize for Enkeli, and received the third prize at Ballet Society Hanover's 25th International Competition for #24.

His first full-length work, Le Petit Prince, based on the novella of the same name, premiered in 2016. He collaborated with set designer Michael Levine and composer Kevin Lau, and consulted Antoine de Saint-Exupéry authority Adam Gopnik. The ballet had a cast of 27 dancers and Côté created different ways of moving for each character while making sure the overall production was coherent.

His second full-length work, Frame by Frame (2018), was a multimedia work directed by Robert Lepage. Co-produced by The National Ballet of Canada, The National Film Board of Canada and Lepage's company, Ex Machina, It celebrated animator and filmmaker Norman McLaren by interweaving classical ballet and film animation in a multimedia experience. "Frame by Frame Leaves Minds Reeling in Amazement" (The Dance Current). Côté and Lepage "reimagined" their groundbreaking multimedia ballet before it was reprised in 2023. In the Toronto Star, Michael Crabb wrote: "Frame by Frame is arguably the National Ballet's most ambitious production to date. With its mashing of dance, storytelling, film and hi-tech visual effects, the audience was wildly enthusiastic. There is never a dull moment. It's quirky, full of action, visually riveting and often quite funny."

Intent on showcasing dance in a different light in order to reach out to a wider audience, Côté choreographed and starred in short film Lost in Motion, and choreographed its sequel, Lost in Motion II, in which Heather Ogden danced on Leonard Cohen's Avalanche. Côté also choreographed for Olympic-winning ice dancing duo Tessa Virtue and Scott Moir that was performed during their farewell tour with "Rock the Rink".

Informed by his classical ballet vocabulary, Guillaume Côté's choreography contours space with resonant geometries and fervent human connections. His choreography emphasizes contemporary forms and refined athleticism.

=== Côté Danse ===
In 2021, Guillaume Côté founded Côté Danse in order to develop independent projects in collaboration with various and diverse artists and partners. At the helm of Côté Danse, he seeks to create original dance works and experiences through scalable productions aimed at a new generation of dance and theatre goers. His later choreographic works involve multimedia (Frame by Frame, Crypto), interdisciplinary collaboration and immersive experiences such as Touch, presented at the Lighthouse Immersive in Toronto from October 2021 to January 2022. Created with digital imagery wizard Thomas Payette, this unique experimental immersive multimedia work involved two dancers, state-of-the-art projections and three-dimensional choreography. Côté feels "there's so much potential in opening up our minds to dance and movement that can be developed beyond a formulaic proscenium stage."

"In work, Robert Lepage has no ego. Everyone is equal in the rehearsal room. If a collaborator or a young dancer has a better idea than his, he includes it in the show. I approach creative work the same way. Instinctive and organic." (Guillaume Côté)

Building on their passion for Shakespeare and the success of their previous collaboration (Frame by Frame), Guillaume Côté and Robert Lepage teamed up again to tell the complex story of Hamlet without words, through movement and music, smoke and mirrors, light and shadows, symbolic props and imaginative set design. A first draft of Hamlet premiered at Festival des Arts de Saint-Sauveur on July 26, 2023. Critics echoed the enthusiastic audience.

=== Selected choreographic works ===
- No. 24 (2010)
- Impermanence (2010)
- Fractals: A Pattern of Chaos (2011)
- Bolero (2012)
- Enkeli (2012)
- Lost in Motion (2012)
- Lost in Motion II (2013)
- Being and Nothingness (2013)
- Body of Work (2014)
- Tonight will be fine (2014)
- Dance Me To the End of Love (2015)
- Le Petit Prince (2016)
- Dark Angels (2016)
- Into Me (2016)
- Cadavre Exquis (2017)
- Scheinriese (2017)
- Une douce souffrance (2018)
- Frame by Frame (2018)
- Hamlet Redux (2018)
- Wish You Were Here (2019)
- Crypto (2019)
- Burn-out fugue (2020)
- Bach to the barre (2020)
- Portraits – Guillaume Côté, Greta Hodgkinson, Sara Mearns (2020)
- Echos (2020)
- Lulu (2020)
- Tiny Pretty Things S1E9 (Netflix series released in 2020)
- Naraka (2021)
- Phi (2021)
- SM (2021)
- X (Dix) (2021)
- Touch (2021)
- Faune (2021)
- Spir (2022)
- Passacaglia pour deux corps (2022)
- Hamlet, Prince of Denmark (2023) With Director Robert Lepage
- Burn Baby, Burn (2024)
- Don't Go Home (2025)
- Grand Mirage (2025)

== Musician and Composer ==
Guillaume Côté grew up playing piano, clarinet and classical guitar. In later years, he learned to play cello and studied composition at The Royal Conservatory of Music. His extensive knowledge of music and musicality led to his writing scores for ballets and films, rehearsing small chamber works and working closely with classical musicians and conductors. He starred in the 2007 documentary Moving to His Music: The Two Muses of Guillaume Côté, for which he composed the music. The film won a Gemini Award for Best Performance in 2007 and a Galileo 2000 Prize in 2008.

=== Selected musical works ===
- Sans Détour (2002) String quartet for Alberta Ballet
- Still.nest (2003) For choreographer Dominique Dumais, presented by Stuttgart Ballet
- KO'd (2007) Piano sonata performed as the finale of "Kings of the Dance" (2007–2012)
- White Light (2008) Performed by The National Ballet Orchestra at the Richard Bradshaw amphitheater.
- Impermanence (2010) Recorded by The National Ballet of Canada Orchestra, performed at the Maggio Musicale Fiorentino
- The Calm Below (2013) Composed and performed for a video by director / choreographer Roberto Campanella

== Festival des Arts de Saint-Sauveur ==
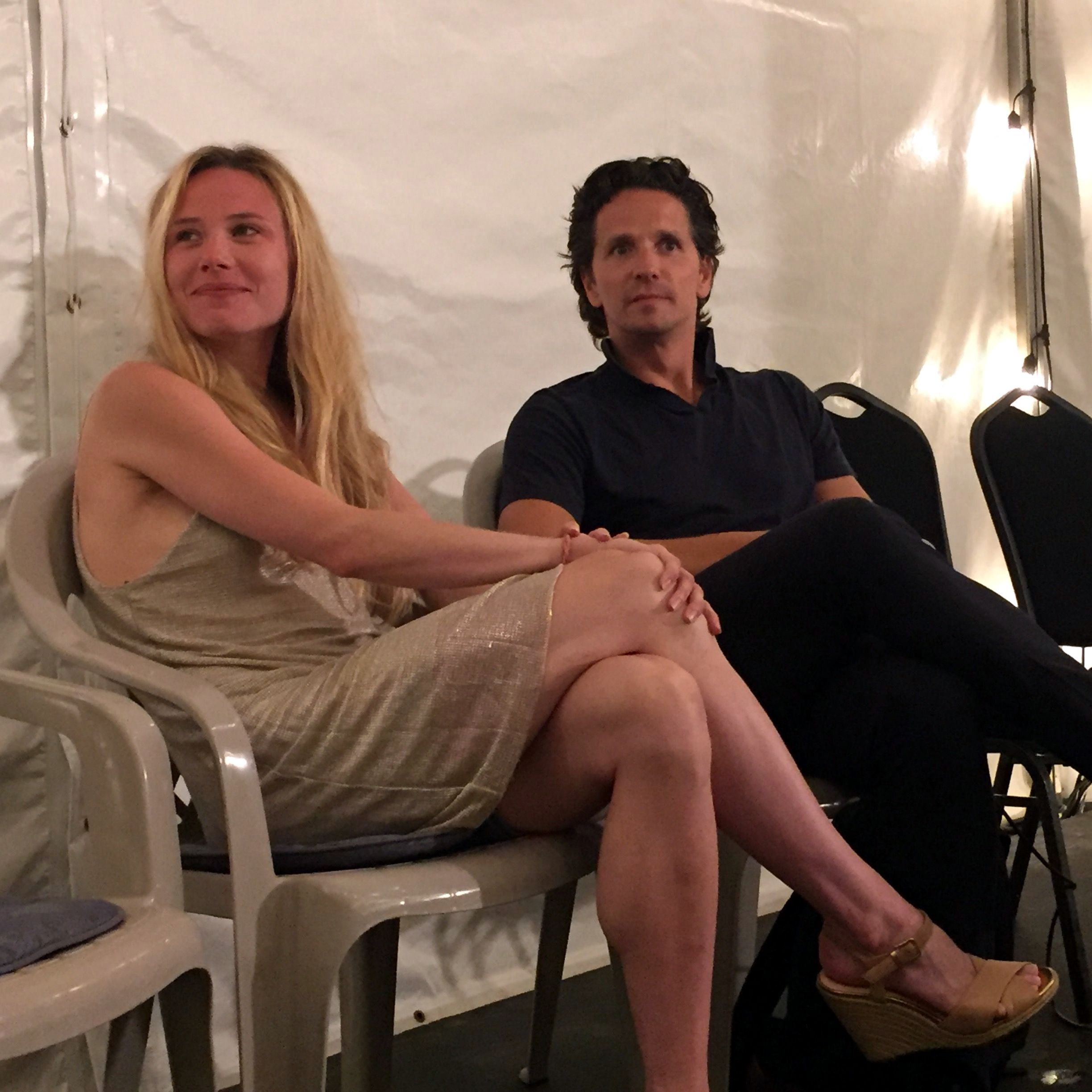
Dancer Sara Mearns and dancer and choreographer Guillaume Côté at the chat following their performance at Festival des arts de Saint-Sauveur in 2022.

In 2014, Guillaume Côté was appointed artistic director of Festival des Arts de Saint-Sauveur (FASS), a dance festival in the Laurentians region of Quebec. Founded in 1992 (as Festival des Arts Hiawatha), FASS has become the largest regional dance presenter in the country, inviting internationally acclaimed as well as up-and-coming artists and companies to perform under a Big Top. Greta Hodgkinson, Friedemann Vogel, Louise Lecavalier, Misty Copeland, Margie Gillis, Sara Mearns, Cesar Corrales, Anne Plamondon, Tiler Peck, Xander Parish, Daniel Ulbritch, Michelle Dorrance, Fabrice Calmels, Evelyn Hart, Julian MacKay. Angèle Dubeau, Rufus Wainwright, Conrad Tao, are among the notable guests at the Festival.

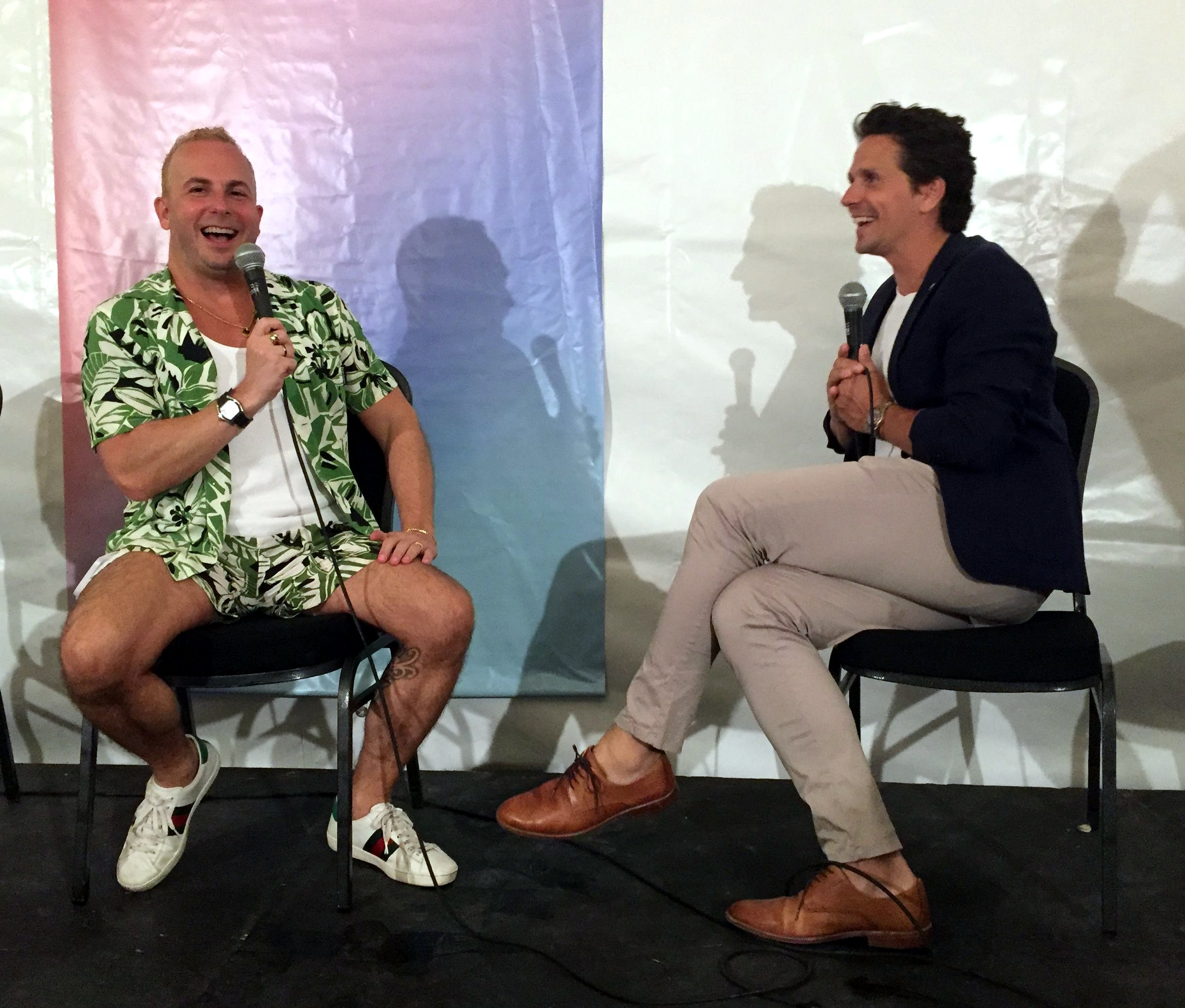
Conductor Yannick Nézet-Séguin and Guillaume Côté at the chat following the Orchestre Métropolitain's concert at Festival des arts de Saint-Sauveur in 2023.

Under Guillaume Côté's tenure as Artistic Director, added emphasis was put on supporting creation, diversity and Quebec artists through showcases and commissioned works. The Festival received a Special Mention as Cultural Event of the Year at the 2000 Grands Prix du Tourisme des Laurentides awards, and won the "Grand Prix du Tourisme des Laurentides" in 2007, 2008 and 2014. In 2009 and 2022, FASS won the Cultural Ambassador of the Laurentians prize, awarded by the Grands prix de la culture des Laurentides, which celebrates the performing arts in the Laurentians. In 2020, FASS won the Prix Opus as the Specialized presenter of the year in Quebec for a digital edition that was put together with the collaboration of conductor Yannick Nézet-Séguin and the Orchestre Métropolitain to make up for the impossibility of holding the event in its usual format during the pandemic. The Shared Solitude program consisted of a collection of works commissioned from 10 composers and 10 choreographers who were paired up. Each joint-creation was performed by a single dancer and one musician, filmed outdoors around Saint-Sauveur and uploaded on the festival's website to be seen worldwide.

== Awards and accolades ==
- 2021 – Chevalier de l'Ordre national du Québec (Knight of the National Order of Quebec.)
- 2020 – Milan International Film Festival Awards (MIFF) for Lulu
- 2019 – Dora Mavor Moore Awards (Toronto) for Best Choreography and Best Production (shared with Robert Lepage) for Frame by Frame
- 2018 – Danse avec la plume (Paris). The National Ballet of Canada won the Plume d'or for Nijinsky and Guillaume Côté received a Mention for his performance at the Théâtre des Champs Élysées in Paris
- 2015 – Enkeli wins Best Choreography and Audience Choice at the 10th International Competition for The Erik Bruhn Prize (Toronto)
- 2012 – Médaille de l'Assemblée nationale du Québec (Medal of the Québec National Assembly) awarded by the members of the Assembly as a token of recognition for performances as a dancer, choreographic works and musical compositions.
- 2011 – Appointed Member of the Société de l'Ordre du Bleuet pour les Arts et la Culture for his contribution to the cultural renown of the Saguenay-Lac-St-Jean region through dance performances, choreographic works and musical compositions.
- 2011 – Dora Mavor Moore Awards (Toronto) for Best Choreography for Fractals: A Pattern of Chaos
- 2011 – Ballet Society Hanover's 25th International Competition (Germany) No. 24 wins Best Choreography (3rd Prize)
- 2010 – Rolex Dancers First Award (Totonto) Best Performance for The Sleeping Beauty with The National Ballet of Canada
- 2008 – Fondazione Premio Galileo (Florence) Pentagramma d'Oro for the music composed for Moving to his Music : The Two Muses of Guillaume Côté
- 2008 – the Commission Scolaire du Lac-Saint-Jean (Alma) gave his name to a room set up to meet the needs of students enrolled in the dance programs at the Pavillon Wilbrod-Dufour.
- 2007 – Gemini Awards (Toronto) Best Performance and Best Music for Moving to His Music: The Two Muses of Guillaume Côté
- 2003 – Dora Mavor Moore Awards (Toronto) for Best Dance Performance for The Contract
- 1998 – International Competition for The Erik Bruhn Prize (Toronto) Best Performance in Dance
- 1998 – YTV Achievement Awards 98 (Toronto)
- 1996 – Diana Brown Awards of The National Ballet School (Toronto)
- Peter Dwyer Award for Best Performance in Dance

== Personal life ==
In 2010, Côté married fellow National Ballet of Canada principal dancer Heather Ogden. The couple has two children. They separated in 2022.
