= Kings of the Dance =

Kings of the Dance was a four night dance extravaganza starring:

- Angel Corella, American Ballet Theatre
- Ethan Stiefel, American Ballet Theatre
- Johan Kobborg, The Royal Ballet, London
- Nikolay Tsiskaridze, The Bolshoi Ballet

And guest stars:

- Alina Cojocaru, The Royal Ballet, London
- Gudrun Bojesen, The Royal Danish Ballet

Kings of the Dance had its premiere February 23, 2006 at New York City Center.

The program consisted of:

- Flemming Flindt's The Lesson (La Leçon) (1963) to music by Georges Delerue
- Christopher Wheeldon's FOR 4 (pièce d'occasion) (2006) to Franz Schubert's Death and the Maiden

New York premiere solos:

- Afternoon of a Faun, (Prelude a l'apres-midi d'un faune) made by Tim Rushton on Johan Kobborg to the music of Claude Debussy
- Wavemaker, made by Nils Christe on Ethan Stiefel to music by John Adams
- We Got It Good, made by Stanton Welch on Angel Corella to music by Billy Strayhorn and Duke Ellington
- Carmen, made by Roland Petit to the music of Georges Bizet, danced by Nikolay Tsiskaridze

Kings of the Dance was co-produced by Ardani Artists and Segerstrom Center for the Arts in February 2006, Sergei Danilian, Producer

Sergei Danilian produced four more programs under title of the Kings of the Dance with different set of dancers including David Hallberg, Marcelo Gomes, Guillaume Côté, Ivan Vasiliev,

Denis Matvienko, Leonid Sarafanov, Jose Manuel Carreño, Joaquin De Luz, Roberto Bolle. Mr. Danilian presented Kings of the Dance project in Russia (Moscow, St. Petersburg, Novosibirsk, Yekaterinburg, Rostov on Don, Krasnodar, Ufa), in Ukraine (Kyiv, Odesa), in Latvia (Riga), in Estonia (Tallinn), Buenos Aires, London, Los Angeles as well as few times in New York.

== Reviews ==
- NY Times, John Rockwell, February 23, 2006
- Village Voice, Deborah Jowitt, March 3, 2006
- Ballet.co Magazine, Anjuli Bai, February 2006
