= Julie Kent (dancer) =

American ballet dancer

- Born: Julie Cox; 1969 (age 56–57); Bethesda, Maryland
- Occupation: Ballet dancer
- Years active: 1985–present
- Spouse: Victor Barbee
- Children: 2
- Career
- Current group: Houston Ballet
- Former groups: The Washington Ballet; American Ballet Theatre

Julie Kent (born Julie Cox, 1969) is an American ballet dancer; she was a principal dancer with the American Ballet Theatre from 1993 to June 2015. In 2016, she was named the artistic director of The Washington Ballet. She became co-artistic director at the Houston Ballet in July 2023.

== Early life ==
She was born Julie Cox in Bethesda, Maryland. Her father was a nuclear physicist and her mother, who is from New Zealand, was a ballet dancer and later flight attendant. She started ballet at age eight. She trained with Hortensia Fonseca at the Academy of the Maryland Youth Ballet. She also spent summers attending intensives at American Ballet Theatre II and School of American Ballet. She took the stage name Julie Kent at the suggestion of Mikhail Baryshnikov.

== Career ==
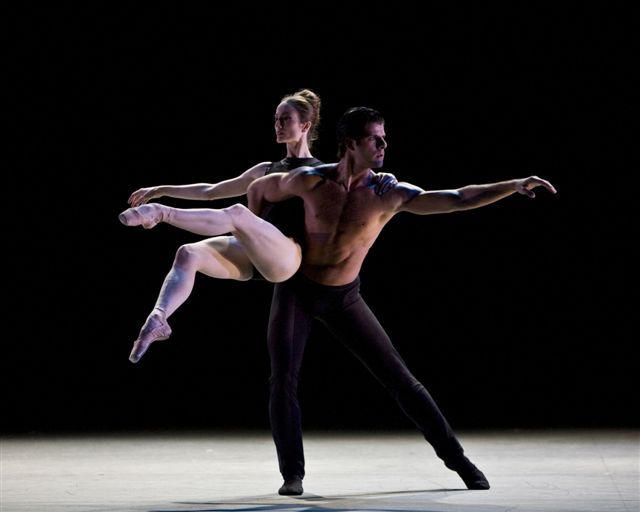
Julie Kent with Marcelo Gomes in 2007

Kent joined the American Ballet Theatre in 1985, as an apprentice. The following year, she competed at the Prix de Lausanne, and was the only American to win any medal that year. Later that year, she became a member of the corps de ballet. In 1990, Kent was promoted to soloist. In 1993, she was named principal dancer, she also became the first American to win the Erik Bruhn Prize that year. In 2000, she received the Prix Benois de la Danse, and is the first American to win the prize.

Throughout her dance career, she has danced works by Marius Petipa, George Balanchine, Jerome Robbins, Frederick Ashton, Kenneth MacMillan and John Cranko. She has created roles in works by John Neumeier, Twyla Tharp, Alexei Ratmansky, Nacho Duato and Stanton Welch. She has made guest appearances in Russia, Italy, Germany, Australia, Argentina and Chile. Kent was one of José Manuel Carreño's partners in Swan Lake, his farewell performance, with Kent as Odette and Gillian Murphy as Odile.

In 2015, Kent retired from dancing. Her farewell performance was Romeo and Juliet, with Roberto Bolle as her Romeo. Having danced with ABT for 29 years, she is the longest-serving principal dancer in the company's history. Following her retirement, she became the artistic director of ABT's summer program, with over 1,000 students training in various locations across the country.

In March 2016, The Washington Ballet announced Kent would assume the role of artistic director, succeeding Septime Webre. During her tenure, she has commissioned 26 new works, including works by Gemma Bond and Ethan Stiefel. She also staged The Sleeping Beauty alongside Victor Barbee.

In October 2022, it was announced that Kent was set to leave Washington Ballet at the end of the 2022-23 season. In July 2023, she became an artistic director at the Houston Ballet, alongside current artistic director Stanton Welch.

== Selected repertoire ==
Kent's repertoire with the American Ballet Theatre includes:

- The title role in Anastasia
- Terpsichore and Calliope in Apollo
- Nikiya in La Bayadère
- The title role in Cinderella (Frederick Ashton, James Kudelka and Ben Stevenson versions)
- Medora in Le Corsaire
- Kitri and the Queen of the Driads in Don Quixote
- Titania in The Dream
- The Dying Swan
- The title role in Giselle
- Caroline in Jardin aux Lilas
- Marguerite in Lady of the Camellias
- The title role in Manon
- Hanna Glawari in The Merry Widow
- Natalia Petrovna in A Month in the Country
- Sugar Plum Fairy in The Nutcracker
- Tatiana in Onegin
- The pas de deux in Other Dances
- The pas de deux in Les Patineurs
- Juliet in Romeo and Juliet
- Princess Aurora in The Sleeping Beauty
- The Sylph in La Sylphide
- Odette-Odile in Swan Lake
- The second movement in Symphony in C
- The Nocturne and the Prelude in Les Sylphides
- The title role in Sylvia
- Tchaikovsky Pas de Deux
- Drink To Me Only With Thine Eyes
- Theme and Variations

=== Created roles ===
- The title role in Artemis
- Sibyl Vane in Dorian
- His Memory and His Experiences in HereAfter
- Apothéose
- Americans We
- Baroque Game
- The Brahms-Haydn Variations
- C. to C. (Close to Chuck)
- Chamber Symphony
- Clear
- Concerto No. 1 for Piano and Orchestra
- Cruel World
- Getting Closer
- Glow - Stop
- Known by Heart
- Rigaudon
- Seven Sonatas
- States of Grace
- Within You Without You: A Tribute to George Harrison
- Without Words

== Awards ==
- First place in the regional finals of the National Society of Arts and Letters, 1985
- A medal at Prix de Lausanne, 1986
- Erik Bruhn Prize, 1993 - first American winner
- Prix Benois de la Danse, 2000 - first American winner
- Honorary Doctorate of Performing Arts from the University of North Carolina School of the Arts, 2012
- Lifetime Achievement Award from Dance Magazine, 2012

== Film appearances ==
Along with Mikhail Baryshnikov, she starred in Herbert Ross' 1987 film Dancers. She was chosen after Baryshnikov saw her audition for ABT.

In Nicholas Hytner's 2000 film Center Stage she played principal dancer Kathleen Donahue, with original choreography by Susan Stroman. The film also stars her ABT colleagues Ethan Stiefel and Sascha Radetsky.

== Personal life ==
Kent is married to Victor Barbee, former ABT Principal Dancer and Associate Artistic Director, and former Washington Ballet Associate Artistic Director. They have two children, Josephine and William.
