= American Dance Festival =

Non-profit organization in the US

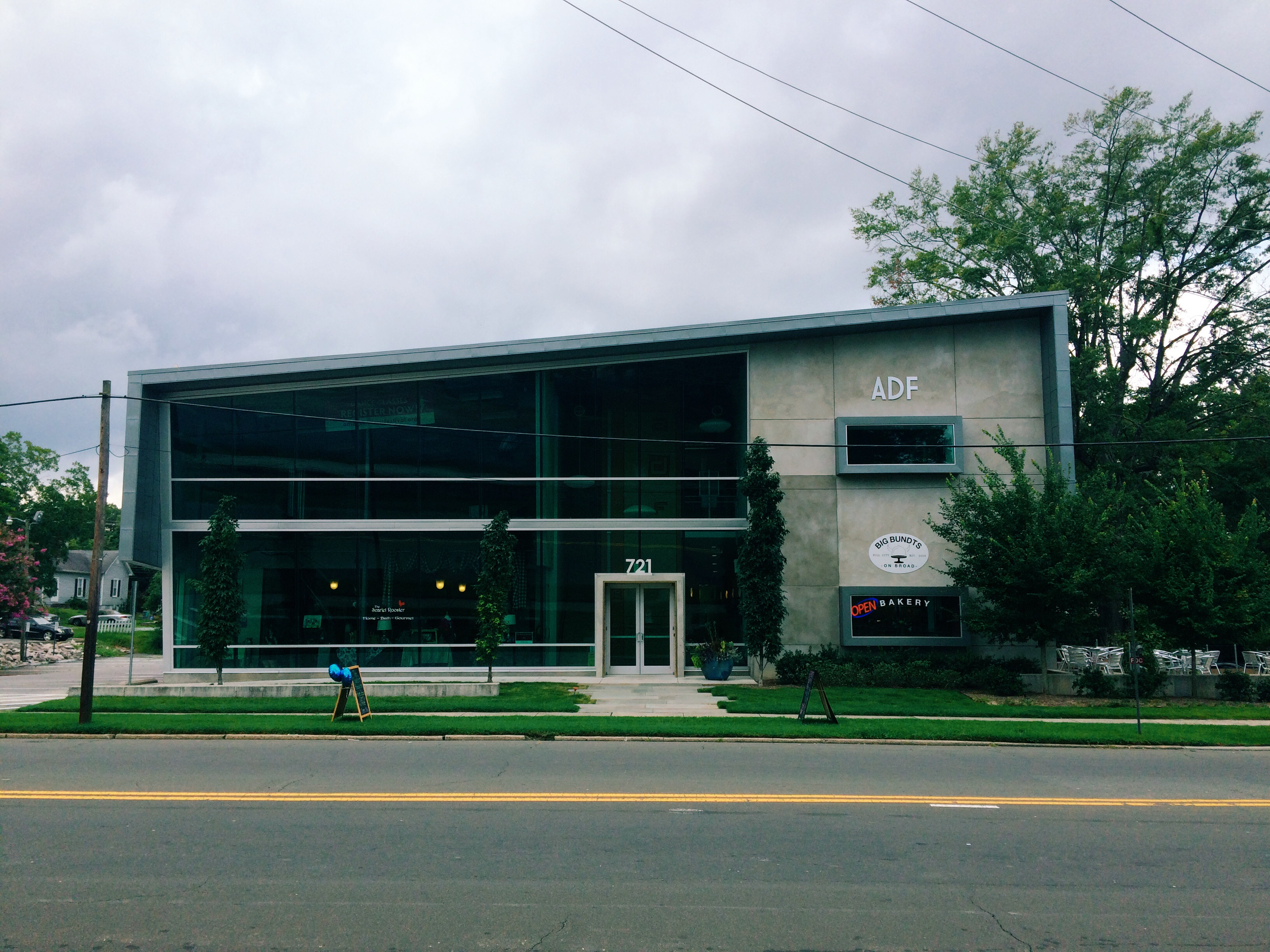
- American Dance Festival's Samuel H. Scripps Studios located in Durham, North Carolina
- Industry: Modern dance
- Founded: 1948
- Headquarters: Durham, North Carolina
- Area served: Research Triangle
- Key people: Jodee Nimerichter (director); Gaspard Louis
- Revenue: 3,531,400 United States dollar (2017)
- Total assets: 13,153,237 United States dollar (2022)
- Website: www.americandancefestival.org

The American Dance Festival (ADF) under the direction of Executive Director Jodee Nimerichter hosts its main summer dance courses including Summer Dance Intensive, Pre-Professional Dance Intensive, and the Dance Professional Workshops. It also hosts a six-week summer festival of modern dance performances, currently held at Duke University and the Durham Performing Arts Center in Durham, North Carolina. Several site-specific performances have also taken place outdoors at Duke Gardens and the NC Art Museum in Raleigh, NC.

== History ==
In 1934 the Bennington Festival was established as a summer program at Bennington College where modern dance pioneers Hanya Holm, Martha Graham, Doris Humphrey and Charles Weidman came together to teach dance technique and perform new works. For one year, in 1939, Bennington moved the program to Mills College in Oakland, California, but it was back in Vermont by 1940. It ceased to exist after the summer of 1942.

In 1948, a program based on the Bennington model was established at Connecticut College in New London, Connecticut, and called the New York University – Connecticut College School of Dance / American Dance Festival. In 1969, newly appointed director Charles Reinhart shortened the name to, simply, the American Dance Festival. After 30 years at the Connecticut College campus, the festival moved, in 1978, to the campus of Duke University in Durham, North Carolina.

Since its founding in 1934, The American Dance Festival has been the home to over six hundred and forty premieres, more than three hundred and forty commissions, and over fifty reconstructions by artists such as Martha Graham, José Limón, Merce Cunningham, Paul Taylor, Alvin Ailey, Twyla Tharp, Pilobolus, Meredith Monk, Martha Clarke, and many more.

Charles Reinhert was the director of the American Dance Festival from 1969 to 2011. In January 2012 Jodee Nimerichter was appointed director after having been a co-director with Charles from 2007 to 2011, and associate director from 2003 to 2007.

Modern dance choreographers and companies who have given performances or taught there include José Limón, Pearl Lang, Bella Lewitzky, Sophie Maslow, Alwin Nikolais, Merce Cunningham, Ruth Currier, Erick Hawkins, Paul Taylor, Alvin Ailey, Twyla Tharp, Betty Jones, Paul Draper, William Bales, Eiko & Koma, Justin Tornow, Seán Curran, Wang Ramirez, Maguy Marin, Pilobolus and Anne Teresa De KeersmaekerRIOULT DANCE NY, Lines Ballet Company, Shen Wei Dance Arts, LMNO3, Heidi Latsky Dance, Bill T. Jones/Arnie Zane Dance Company.

In 1978, Madonna, who was at the time a dance major at the University of Michigan, was a summer dance student at the American Dance Festival.

Numerous dance works have premiered at the American Dance Festival, many of them commissioned by ADF. The largest theater in the Carolinas, the Durham Performing Arts Center, was built partly as a showcase for the festival. In 2016, the American Dance Festival with support from the Doris Duke/SHS Foundations Award for New Dances, commissioned Pascal Rioult's Cassandra's Curse with music by Richard Danielpour.

ADF has given scholarships and awards out to accomplished dance figures. The Scholarship is entitled the Samuel H. Scripps/American Dance Festival Award for Lifetime Achievement in Choreography and is $50,000 given to one distinguished choreographer per year. These recipients include Merce Cunningham, Paul Taylor, Ohad Naharin, Pina Bausch, Twyla Tharp, Jose Limon, and others.

ADF also awards distinguished dance teachers. This award is entitled the Balasaraswati/Joy Anne Dewey Beinecke Endowed Chair for Distinguished Teaching. Recipients of this award include Gerri Houlihan, Gus Solomons Jr., Donna Faye Burchield, Jacylnn Villamil, Irene Dowd and others.

The American Dance Festival also offers internships during their summer session for both Arts Administration and Production. Interns are able to take one dance class per day and then the remainder of their day is filled with working in the ADF offices for those interested in Arts Administration, or learning the tools and skills of stage hand work and spending 40+ in the theater by being on the crew for every professional company throughout the festival. Both internships include a full tuition scholarship to the Six Week school. Applicants must apply for these internships, and selection is very competitive.

The American Dance Festival also offers classes year round in the Samuel H. Scripps Studio. The Studios offer classes for all ages and levels throughout the calendar year. During the summer session, the studio is used throughout the Six Week School in addition to spaces provided from Duke University.

In addition to the summer sessions and year-round programs based in Durham, NC, ADF also hosts a Winter Intensive in both New York City and Pasadena, CA. Both of these programs are for dancers ages 18+.
