= Jodee Nimerichter =

American arts administrator

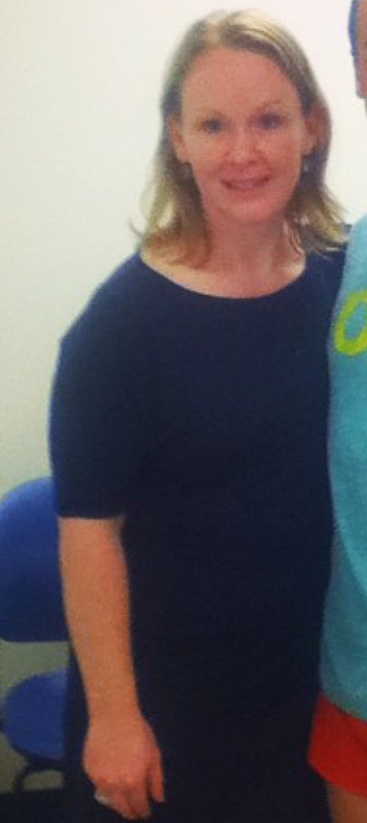
- Nimerichter in 2014.
- Born: Colorado
- Education: New York University
- Occupations: arts administrator, film producer
- Known for: American Dance Festival
- Spouse: Gaspard Louis (m. 2005)
- Children: 2
- Parent(s): Fred Nimerichter (father); Mary Lou Buhl (mother)

Jodee Nimerichter is an American arts administrator and film producer. She currently serves as the executive director of the American Dance Festival.

== Early life and education ==
Jodee Nimerichter is the daughter of Fred Nimerichter and Mary Lou Buhl. She has two sisters, Cynthia and Rhonda, and grew up in Colorado. She is of German ancestry and was raised in the Lutheran faith. She trained in classical ballet from a young age and was admitted to Gallatin School of Individualized Study at New York University. In 1992 she decided to stop dancing, and switched her major to performing arts administration. While she was enrolled at NYU, she interned at the American Dance Festival, Jacob's Pillow Dance, and Changing Times Tap Dancing Company. She also helped start the first Gallatin Arts Festival at NYU.

== Career ==
=== American Dance Festival ===
Nimerichter began working for the American Dance Festival in 1991 as an intern. In 1997 she worked on the production of the festival's documentary series Free to Dance and was nominated for an Emmy Award in Research. She co-produced televised recordings of the Broadway revival of The Women and the musical Fosse. She worked as an associate producer for the live broadcasts of The Man Who Came To Dinner and Fosse Millennium in 2000. In 2003 she became the festival's associate director, managing dance festivals in South Korea and Russia and building dance exchange programs in South Africa, Poland, Argentina, and the Philippines. Nimerichter organized the first American tour of the Guangdong Modern Dance Company from Guangzhou, China. She served as associate director until 2007, when she was promoted as co-director. In 2007 she produced Dancing in the Light, a program focused on six works by African-American choreographers, for the Public Broadcasting Service. Nimerichter also worked as a production member of Great Performances:Dance in America at WNET where she co-produced the performance documentary Born to Be Wild: The Leading Men of American Ballet Theatre, which followed dancers Jose Manuel Carreño, Angel Corella, Vladimir Malakhov, and Ethan Stiefel as they began working on a new piece created for them by Mark Morris.

Nimerichter was appointed as the director of the American Dance Festival in 2012. Her title changed to executive director in 2016.

=== Other curations ===
Nimerichter curated performances at the Joyce Theater for Focus Dance in 2013 and at New York University's Skirball Center for the Performing Arts for Dance Gotham in 2014. She has also served as a Hub Site representative for the National Dance Project.

=== Affiliations ===
She also serves on the boards of the American Dance Festival and ARTS North Carolina, and serves on the advisory board of Emory College Center for Creativity & Arts and as board member for Durham Central Park.

She serves on the board of directors for Mark Dendy Dance & Theatre and was a member of the Appalachian Summer Festival's artistic partnership team in 2008 and 2009.

== Personal life ==
Nimerichter lives in North Carolina and New York, splitting her time between homes in Durham and Manhattan. She met Gaspard Louis, a Haitian dancer, while she was working as a staffer at the American Dance Festival and he was dancing with Pilobolus Dance Theatre. She and Louis married in October 2005 and have two children, Dahlia and Preston.
