= Ruth Currier =

Ruth Currier (January 4, 1926 – October 4, 2011) was an American dancer, choreographer, and dance teacher. She was a principal dancer with the José Limón Dance Company from the late 1940s into the 1960s. She later served as that company's director following Limón's death from 1972 to 1978.

She taught on the dance faculties of the Juilliard School, Ohio State University, Bennington College, Sarah Lawrence College and the American Dance Festival.
