= Gaspard Louis =

Haitian dancer

- Born: Haiti
- Occupations: dancer, choreographer, artistic director
- Spouse: Jodee Nimerichter (m. 2005)
- Children: 2
- Career
- Current group: Gaspard and Dancers
- Former groups: AllNations; Pilobolus
- Education: Montclair State University; Hollins University
- Website: gaspardanddancers.org

Gaspard Louis is a Haitian dancer, choreographer, and artistic director. A former dancer with Pilobolus, he is the founder and artistic director of the modern dance company Gaspard and Dancers. Louis is also on the faculty at North Carolina Central University and the American Dance Festival.

== Early life and education ==
Louis was born in Haiti. He immigrated to the United States when he was thirteen years old, living in Newark, New Jersey. Louis did not start training as a dancer until college. He received a Bachelor of Fine Arts degree in dance from Montclair State University through a partnership program at the American Dance Festival. He continued his dance studies as a scholarship student with Giordano Dance Chicago and the Nikolais/Louis Dance Lab in New York. He received a Master of Fine Arts degree in dance from Hollins University.

== Career ==
After finishing his undergraduate studies, Louis joined the New York-based dance company AllNations, where he performed traditional world dances. He was a company member with Pilobolus for ten years and also collaborated on the choreography for nine major dance works with the company. He has also guest taught for dance programs at Duke University, North Carolina Central University, and Elon University. He later joined the faculty at North Carolina Central University.

Louis formed his own company, titled Gaspard and Dancers, in 2009 which is based in Durham, North Carolina. He and his company have performed at the Wake Forest Dance Festival, the Cape Fear Stage in Wilmington, the North Carolina Museum of Art, Duke University, the North Carolina Dance Festival, the American Dance Festival, and in Bermuda.

In 2012 Louis choreographed a trilogy of works, titled L’Espirit, Souke and Annatations, in response to the 2010 Haiti earthquake. The works focused on dealing with tragedy and the human response to it. The trilogy was performed at the Michael Schimmel Center for the Arts in September 2015. It was later presented at the 18th annual International Festival of Contemporary Dance in Krasnoyarsk, Russia and at the American Dance Festival. Louis has also worked with Justin Tornow who, with himself, he set a duet on called Forbidden which was performed at Duke University.

In September 2019 he and his company performed at Elon University as part of the Lyceum Series. The show had political undertones, focusing on immigration in the United States.

He has also choreographed for Free Space Dance Company in New Jersey and the Kentucky University Dance Ensemble.

Louis has served on the faculty at the American Dance Festival, serving as the director of the Creative Movement Outreach Program.

== Personal life ==
Louis married Jodee Nimerichter in October 2005. They have two children, named Dahlia and Preston. They split their time between homes in Manhattan and Durham, North Carolina.
