= Ballet San Jose =

Ballet company based in California, US

Ballet San Jose was a ballet company based in San Jose, California, US, operating from 1985 to 2016.

== History ==
The company was founded in 1985 as the "San Jose Cleveland Ballet," a co-venture with the ten-year-old Cleveland Ballet which offered to the dancers added performing exposure, and each city a ballet company for a moderate, shared investment. In 2000, the Cleveland Ballet ceased operations, and over half the dancers, the headquarters, and artistic director/choreographer Dennis Nahat moved to San Jose to continue operations there. The company was originally known as Ballet San Jose Silicon Valley, but in July 2006 shortened its name to simply Ballet San Jose.

In 2003, the company gained benefactor and current chairman of the board John Fry, co-founder of Fry's Electronics.with a 1 million dollar contribution. Fry helped the company survive the dot-com crash and continued to support the company until he closed it in 2016. Over the years Fry became personally involved and Ballet San Jose faced increasing Fry's support, prompting Karen Loewenstern, founding board chair of Cleveland San Jose Ballet to say "...he bought himself a ballet company."

By 2007, still led by founding artistic director, Dennis Nahat, there was a resident company of 44 dancers from 14 countries in four continents, with a repertoire of over 120 traditional and modern classical ballets. Performances at the San Jose Center for the Performing Arts are accompanied by the Symphony Silicon Valley. The Ballet was now a 'fully owned' resident company serving all of Silicon Valley.

On December 23, 2011, Ballet San Jose and John Fry announced a partnership with American Ballet Theatre (ABT) which will license the company "to implement ABT's comprehensive National Training Curriculum for dancers and receive its rolodex and world renowned repertory". In January 2012, Nahat was “ousted” and John Fry in a letter prepared by his newly appointed Executive Director Stephanie Ziesel said that his services were no longer required due to the ABT arrangement. Fry said, “ABT and its artistic director Kevin McKenzie won't collaborate as long as Nahat is still here. You know, it's the greatest company in the world.“. Shortly after, Fry stepped down from the board, replaced as chair by Lorraine Gilmore of Edison Pharmaceuticals. Kathy Kolder, Vice President of Fry's Electronics, remained on the board with Fry's intention to continue its financial support. But, it did not come to be.

Artistic direction was shared for two seasons by Principal Ballet Master and former long time principal dancer of Cleveland San Jose Ballet, Raymond Rodriguez and former retired ABT dancer, Artistic Advisor Wes Chapman. George Daugherty was appointed Music Director and Principal Conductor in August 2012 after Maestro Dwight Oltman's 35-year tenure. José Manuel Carreño was appointed Artistic Director effective September 2013.

In March 2015, with mounting debt, the company announced an emergency fundraiser in which it needed to raise $550,000 to maintain operations and cover the expenses of the rest of the season. Ziesel was fired and under the direction of the newly appointed CEO Alan Hineline, the company was paying off debt and attempting to update its business model to be more sustainable. The fundraising campaign was successful, but mounting debt surpassed it. Hineline resigned.

In September 2015, the company again changed its name to Silicon Valley Ballet in an "effort to erase the passed and incorporate the greater Silicon Valley area." As Silicon Valley Ballet, the company went on a multi-week tour to Spain mid-January to mid-February 2016. They performed the "Director's Choice" mixed repertoire program. Upon arriving home to San Jose after a disastrous financial and artistic tour, the company performed the same program but it turned out to be the last.

In March 2016, the Ballet announced it was closing. At the time of its closing there were 30 union dancers plus all artistic, production and administrative staff laid off permanently. The school stayed open and became the New Ballet School with the ABT approved syllabus, under former Cleveland San Jose Ballet dancer Dalia Rawson and Ballet San Jose dancer Alexsandra Meijer.

== Repertoire ==
The company developed a repertoire of over 120 traditional and modern classical ballets under founder Dennis Nahat, performed by dancers from Argentina, Canada, China, Cuba, Denmark, France, Germany, Japan, Russia, Venezuela, Vietnam, and the United States. The repertoire includes ballets by Balanchine, Bournonville, de Mille, Daryl Gray, Flemming Flindt, Donald McKayle, Kurt Jooss and the bulk of the repertory specially-created ballets by founder Dennis Nahat. The company performed all the classic ballets such as Giselle, The Nutcracker and Swan Lake and more modern ballets such as Nahat's ground breaking Blue Suede Shoes, based on Elvis Presley's songs and Flindt full evening modern classics.

In 2008, Nahat arranged to take the company on an unprecedented 8-city tour of China. Called the "Goodwill Tour From Silicon Valley," it represented the first international tour of the company since its move from Cleveland.

Under newly appointed artistic director José Manuel Carreño, the 2015/2016 season included a staging of Alicia Alonso's Giselle utilizing Nahat's staging of Giselle production concepts and retired Cleveland San Jose Ballet, Ballerina Karen Gabay's new Nutcracker with a production from ABT and the "Director’s Choice" mixed rep program. The "Director’s Choice" Program included Ohad Naharin's Minus 16, Cuban Pas De Duex featuring various classics staged by José Manuel Carreño, Jorma Elo's Glow Stop, and Annabelle Lopez Ochoa's Prism. This program was also performed during the company's tour to Spain.

== Artistic direction ==
Nahat was not allowed to announce preparations for the 2012 season which were delayed, with the dancers' contract being finalized in December 2011 and rehearsals for any performances other than The Nutcracker not begun by mid-December. The company's web site on January 5, 2012, had not announced its 2012 season, but a "shortened" season was later announced, with programs for March, April and May. Although earlier reports that Artistic Director Dennis Nahat might be replaced were subsequently denied, his role in the company remained unclear and the 2012 program will be chosen by the new artistic committee and new board of directors appointed by Fry since all former major board members resigned after Nahat's ousting. In January 2012, the new leaders removed Nahat in a letter directed by Fry and delivered by executive director, Stephanie Ziesel stating that his services were no longer required from his role as artistic director and he left the company.

The company danced to recorded music for its spring 2012 repertory season, but all 2012–2013 performances are being accompanied by Symphony Silicon Valley, including new productions of The Nutcracker in December 2012, a new full-length Don Quixote was staged and performed by ABT retired principal dancer José Manual Carreño using sets and costumes from a number of Nahat productions in February 2013, as well as such pieces of mixed repertoire as Sir Frederick Ashton's Lez Rendez-vous and Thais Pas de Deux, and Clark Tippet's (Former Cleveland Ballet dancer and ABT Principal) Bruch Violin Concerto. Beginning in 2013, most of the ballet's performances were danced to recorded music instead of a live orchestra.

José Manuel Carreño became artistic director September 3, 2013, and remained through the company's closure.

== Education ==
The Ballet San Jose School was established in 1996. Upon the closure of the company, the school is now its own entity, The New Ballet School. It is an American Ballet Theatre Certified School run under the direction of former Cleveland San Jose Ballet dancer, executive director, Dalia Rawson.
