= José Manuel Carreño =

Cuban ballet dancer

- Born: 25 May 1968 (age 57); Havana, Cuba
- Occupation: ballet dancer
- Years active: 1990–2011
- Career
- Former groups: English National Ballet, Royal Ballet, American Ballet Theatre, Ballet San Jose

José Manuel Carreño (born 25 May 1968) is a retired Cuban ballet dancer, who performed as a principal dancer with the English National Ballet, Royal Ballet and American Ballet Theatre.

Carreño started dancing at the age of ten and received his training at the Provincial School of Ballet and the Cuban National Ballet School. He won the gold medal at the New York International Ballet Competition in 1987 and the Grand Prix at the International Ballet Competition in Jackson, Mississippi in 1990. He has appeared extensively in Europe, Latin America and the United States, dancing such roles as Franz in Coppélia, Basilio in Don Quixote, Albrecht in Giselle and Prince Siegfried in Swan Lake. He has also performed in the principal roles in such works as Le Corsaire, the Diane and Actéon pas de deux and the Black Swan pas de deux.

He has been principal dancer in the English National Ballet in 1990, The Royal Ballet in 1993 and the American Ballet Theatre starting in 1995.

In 2004 Carreño received the Dance Magazine Award for significant contributions to the ballet world.

In 2007 he appeared in the movie, Born to Be Wild – The Leading Men of American Ballet Theatre with Angel Corella, Ethan Stiefel and Vladimir Malakhov, directed by Judy Kinberg and produced by Jodee Nimerichter.

On 30 June 2011 he gave his final performance with the ABT in New York City at the Metropolitan Opera House in Swan Lake featuring Julie Kent and Gillian Murphy as Odille and Odette. Carreño was joined on stage by other members of the company including Marcelo Gomes, Maxim Beloserkovsky and Cory Stearns who hoisted him overhead.

Carreño served as the artistic director of the Ballet San Jose from 3 September 2013 until the company closed in 2016.

He has performed on Dancing With The Stars television program.

Carreño was artistic director of the Carreño Dance Festival in Sarasota, Florida until the program was discontinued in 2015. He served as the artistic director of Ballet de Monterrey (Mexico)from November 2016 until December 2018.

== Personal life ==
Carreno was married to fellow dancer Lourdes Novoa and had two daughters, Carmen and Alessandra. Carreño was engaged to fellow ballet dancer Melanie Hamrick. They ended their relationship in 2014.
