= Heather Ogden =

Canadian ballet dancer

- Born: December 24, 1980 (age 45); Toronto, Ontario, Canada
- Occupation: Ballet dancer
- Years active: 1998–present
- Spouse: Guillaume Côté (m. 2010–2022)
- Children: 2
- Dancing career
- Current group: National Ballet of Canada
- Dances: Ballet

Heather Ogden is a Canadian ballet dancer. She is a principal dancer at the National Ballet of Canada.

== Early life ==
Ogden was born in Toronto, Ontario. She and her family moved to Richmond, British Columbia when she was 6. After seeing her babysitter dance, Ogden started training at the Richmond Academy of Dance. She graduated in 1998.

== Career ==
In 1998, Ogden joined the National Ballet of Canada as an apprentice, and was promoted to the corps de ballet the following year. Ogden was named Principal Dancer in 2005. She has danced principal roles in productions such as Swan Lake, Romeo and Juliet, The Sleeping Beauty and Cinderella.

Reviewing her performance as Princess Aurora in The Sleeping Beauty, The Globe and Mail called her performance "jaw-dropping. Without so much as a wobble, she seemed to hang in the air for an eternity." On Nijinsky, The Globe and Mail called Ogden's dancing "full of tenderness and pathos" as her character's "marriage (and her husband's mind) falls apart later on."

Outside of the National Ballet, Ogden has also made guest appearances with The Suzanne Farrell Ballet, Stuttgart Ballet, Hamburg Ballet, Munich Ballet and multiple galas. In 2014, she became an ambassador for Rolex Canada.

Ogden was featured in 2013 short film Lost In Motion II.

== Selected repertoire ==
- Odette-Odile in Swan Lake
- Princess Aurora in The Sleeping Beauty
- Juliet in Romeo and Juliet
- Sugar Plum Fairy in The Nutcracker
- Romola in Nijinsky
- Hanna Glawari in The Merry Widow
- Cinderella and Fairy Godmother in Cinderella
- Hermione in The Winter’s Tale
- Alice in Alice’s Adventures in Wonderland
- Anna Karenina in Anna Karenina
- Carmen in Carmen

== Personal life ==
In 2010, Ogden married fellow National Ballet principal dancer Guillaume Côté. The couple has two children. They separated in 2022.

Ogden grew up playing softball, but gave up to focus on ballet. In 2017, she threw a ceremonial first pitch at a Toronto Blue Jays baseball game.
