= Joaquín De Luz =

Spanish ballet dancer (born 1976)

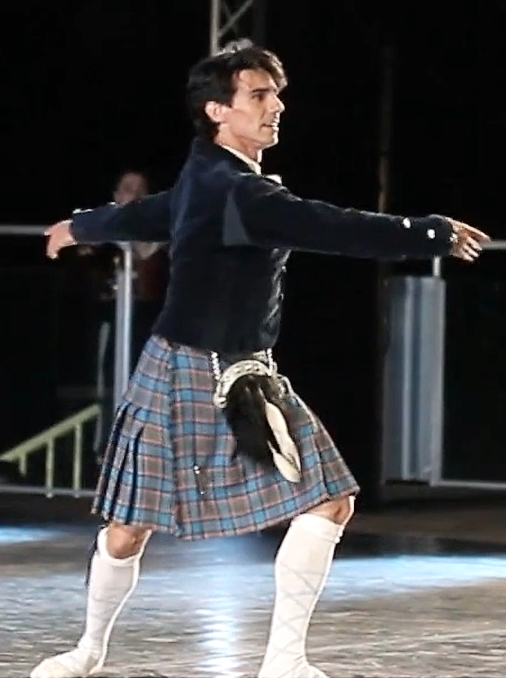
De Luz at the Ravello Festival in the Bournonville version of La Sylphide, as James, in 2013

Joaquín De Luz (born 1976, Madrid, Spain) is a Spanish ballet dancer. He was formerly with the American Ballet Theatre (ABT), and a principal dancer with the New York City Ballet (NYCB). He is currently director of Spanish National Dance Company.

== Background ==
He received his training at the Víctor Ullate School of Ballet. This a ballet and Spanish dancing, Madrid-based school that started the careers of many of Spain's most sought after dancers. He danced with the Víctor Ullate Ballet Company from 1992 to 1995. In August 1996, he auditioned in New York and joined the Pennsylvania Ballet as a soloist. He danced leading roles in La Bayadére, Diana and Acteon, Don Quixote, Paquita, The Sleeping Beauty, and Swan Lake, as well as Allegro Brillante, Theme and Variations, and Who Cares? while performing with Pennsylvania Ballet. In 1997 De Luz left Pennsylvania Ballet and joined American Ballet Theatre, (ABT) as a member of the corps de ballet. He was then promoted to soloist in 1998 where he performed roles in the Bronze Idol in La Bayadére (choreographed by Natalia Makarova after Marius Petipa), the Red Cowboy in Billy The Kid (Eugene Loring), the first sailor in Fancy Free (Jerome Robbins), Benno in Swan Lake (Kevin McKenzie after Marius Petipa and Lev Ivanov), and leading roles in Bruch Violin Concerto No. 1 (Clark Tippet) and Theme and Variations (George Balanchine),Bruch Violin Concerto No. 1 (Clark Tippet), Black Tuesday (Paul Taylor), Diversion of Angels (Martha Graham), Clear (Stanton Welch), and Gong (Mark Morris). De Luz then joined New York City Ballet (NYCB) as a soloist in 2003, and in January 2005, he was promoted to the rank of principal dancer. His featured roles since joining New York City Ballet include: George Balanchine's Ballo della Regina, Coppelia (Frantz), "Divertimento" from Le baiser de la fée, Donizetti Variations, The Nutcracker ("Cavalier", "Tea", and "Candy Cane"), Harlequinade (Harlequin and Pierrot), Jewels ("Rubies"), A Midsummer Night's Dream (Oberon), Symphony in C (Third Movement), Tarantella, Theme and Variations, Tschaikovsky Pas de Deux, Valse-Fantaise, Vienna Waltzes, Peter Martins' Jeu de cartes, Octet, The Sleeping Beauty (Bluebird), Swan Lake (Pas de Quatre), Jerome Robbins' Andantino, Brandenburg, Dances at a Gathering, Dybbuk, Fancy Free, Four Bagatelles, The Four Seasons (Fall), The Goldberg Variations, Other Dances, Piano Pieces, and Christopher Wheeldon's Mercurial Manoeuvres. De Luz originated a featured role in, Jorma Elo's Slice To Sharp, Peter Martins' Romeo + Juliet (Tybalt), and Christopher Wheeldon's Shambards and Alexei Ratmansky's Concerto DSCH. In 2003, De Luz became a permanent guest faculty member of The Rock School in Philadelphia. In 2009 De Luz and Tiler Peck performed in Indianapolis City Ballet's An Evening With the Stars.

== Other performances ==
Joaquin De Luz has appeared as a Guest Artist in many dance events. He performed with Ballet Mediterraneo, a professional Spanish company, with Fernando Bujones. He performed with American Ballet Stars 1997 Tour of China, a celebration of George Balanchine hosted by National Ballet of China. This performance was based on helping the Chinese population learn more about Balanchine. He performed in Ballet Hawaii's 2005 Nutcracker at the Blaisdell Center as the Cavalier. He also performed with Kings of the Dance, touring Russia and Ukraine, dancing Christopher Wheeldon's For Four, David Fernandez's Five Variations on a theme, and Fleming Flint's The lesson in 2008. He performed in American Ballet Theatre's taping of Le Corsaire, which aired on television, in 1999 and in New York City Ballet's Romeo and Juliet which also aired on television live from Lincoln Center. De Luz performed in Stars of the 21st Century International Ballet Gala in the New York State Theater, Lincoln Center, a performance celebrating the excellence in classical dance. He will also be performing with the Indianapolis City Ballet's, "Evening With the Stars," a show of premier dancers. He has also attended other international galas including: TITAS, Youth America Grand Prix, and Balletissimo in Mexico DF. De Luz created a group of New York city ballet dancers who have toured during the summer, in different cities of Spain, since 2007.

In 2018, Joaquín De Luz performed as Villella in Dances at a Gathering and prior to his retirement did his final act in George Balanchine's Theme and Variations at the David H. Koch Theater.

== Honors ==
In March 1996, De Luz won the gold medal at the Second Nureyev International Ballet Competition in Budapest, Hungary. In February 1997, he was awarded the Rising Star prize by Seven Arts Magazine in Philadelphia, Pennsylvania. De Luz represented Spain at the Expo '98 in Lisbon, Portugal, dancing in the gala Stars of Spanish Ballet. His most recent award was the Prix Benois de la Danse, given out in Italy, in 2009 for best male performance of the year for his role in The Prodigal Son.

== Charitable program ==
De Luz created an organization called "Joaquin's Tour de Force", a small charitable program that targets schools, hospitals, and children's charities. It helps young, inner-city kids experience ballet by giving them free tickets to performances. It is made possible by contributions from individuals, ballet companies, and other organizations.
