= Gillian Murphy =

American ballet dancer

- Born: April 11, 1979 (age 47); Wimbledon, England
- Education: University of North Carolina School of the Arts
- Occupation: Ballet dancer
- Spouse: Ethan Stiefel (m. 2015)
- Children: 1
- Dancing career
- Current group: American Ballet Theatre
- Website: GillianMurphy.com

Gillian Murphy and Maxim Beloserkovsky in American Ballet Theatre's 2005 production of Sir Frederick Ashton's Sylvia.

Gillian Murphy (/ˈdʒɪliən/ JIL-ee-ən; born April 11, 1979) is a British-born American ballet dancer who is a principal dancer with the American Ballet Theatre.

== Early life and education ==
Raised in Florence, South Carolina, Murphy is of Irish descent with both of her parents having roots in County Cork. She was a member of Columbia City Ballet before attending high school at University of North Carolina School of the Arts. There, under the tutelage of Melissa Hayden, she danced principal roles in several of the school's productions, including The Nutcracker and George Balanchine’s Concerto Barocco, Western Symphony, Tarantella and Theme and Variations.

== Career ==
Following her graduation from high school, Murphy joined American Ballet Theatre's corps de ballet in August 1996 at the age of 17. She was promoted to soloist in 1998. In 2001, her debut as Odette/Odile in Swan Lake garnered rave reviews from The New York Times. The following year she was promoted to principal dancer. That same year she was named one of Dance Magazine's 25 To Watch by Gus Solomon Jr.

Murphy has performed as a guest artist with Mariinsky Ballet, Royal Swedish Ballet, Staatsballett Berlin, Kyiv Ballet, and The Australian Ballet. She spent 3 years as a Guest Principal with Royal New Zealand Ballet, during her husband's tenure as the company's director.

Murphy celebrated her 20th anniversary with ABT on May 28, 2016, with a performance of La Fille mal gardée.

After 29 years with the American Ballet Theatre, Murphy took her final bow in the iconic role of Odette/Odile in Swan Lake on Friday, July 18, 2025, at the Metropolitan Opera House.

== Selected repertoire ==
Murphy's repertory with the American Ballet Theatre includes:

- Nikiya and Gamzatti in La Bayadère
- The Ballerina in The Bright Stream
- Cinderella in Frederick Ashton’s Cinderella
- Cinderella in James Kudelka’s Cinderella
- Swanilda in Coppélia
- Medora and Gulnare in Le Corsaire
- Kitri in Don Quixote
- Titania in The Dream
- The second girl in Fancy Free
- Lise in La Fille mal gardée
- The Flames of Paris pas de deux
- Grand Pas Classique
- Giselle and Myrta in Giselle
- Manon in Lady of the Camellias
- Lescaut’s Mistress in Manon
- The Sugar Plum Fairy in Kevin McKenzie’s The Nutcracker
- Other Dances
- The title role in Raymonda
- Juliet in Romeo and Juliet
- Princess Aurora in Ratmansky’s The Sleeping Beauty
- Princess Aurora and the Lilac Fairy in The Sleeping Beauty
- Odette-Odile in Swan Lake
- The title role in Sylvia
- The first and third movements in Symphony in C
- Tschaikovsky Pas de Deux
- The ballerina in Theme and Variations
- Princess Tea Flower in Whipped Cream
- Bach Partita
- Les Patineurs
- Piano Concerto #1
- Les Sylphides

=== Created roles ===
- Pierrette in Alexei Ratmansky’s Harlequinade
- Clara, the Princess in Ratmansky’s The Nutcracker
- Leading roles in Her Notes
- Kaleidoscope
- Rabbit and Rogue
- Thirteen Diversions
- After You
- Dream within a Dream (deferred)
- Glow – Stop
- One of Three
- Praedicere
- Within You Without You: A Tribute to George Harrison

== Awards ==
- Awarded the Prix de Lausanne Espoir (1995)
- Presidential Scholar nominee (1996)
- Awarded a Dance Fellowship by the Princess Grace Foundation (1998)
- Received the Princess Grace Statue Award (2009)
- Honorary Doctorate, University of North Carolina School of the Arts

== Television and movie appearances ==
In 2000, she had a small part in the film Center Stage, which featured her ABT colleagues Ethan Stiefel, Julie Kent, and Sascha Radetsky in starring roles. She also appeared in the film's sequel, Center Stage: Turn It Up. In 2005 she performed the dual role, Odette and Odile, in Kevin McKenzie's version of Swan Lake with ABT. This performance was filmed and broadcast as a part of Great Performances: Dance in America on PBS. In 2010 she appeared as herself in season 4, episode 8 of Gossip Girl with Ethan Stiefel. She also appears as the eponymous character in Royal New Zealand Ballet's documentary and filmed production of Giselle. Behind the scenes, she served as a ballet consultant on the movie Black Swan.

== Personal life ==
On September 19, 2015, Murphy married her longtime partner Ethan Stiefel, a former principal dancer with American Ballet Theatre and New York City Ballet. Stiefel proposed to her following her performance in the opening night gala of American Ballet Theatre's 2011 season. On December 14, 2018, Murphy announced that she was pregnant with their first child and would take maternity leave for the 2018-2019 season. In June 2019, Murphy announced the birth of her first child, Ax Nathaniel Stiefel.

Murphy graduated from St. Mary's College in 2018. She completed the Crossover to Business program for professional artists and athletes at Harvard Business School.
