= Edouard Pliner =

Russian figure skating coach (1936–2016)

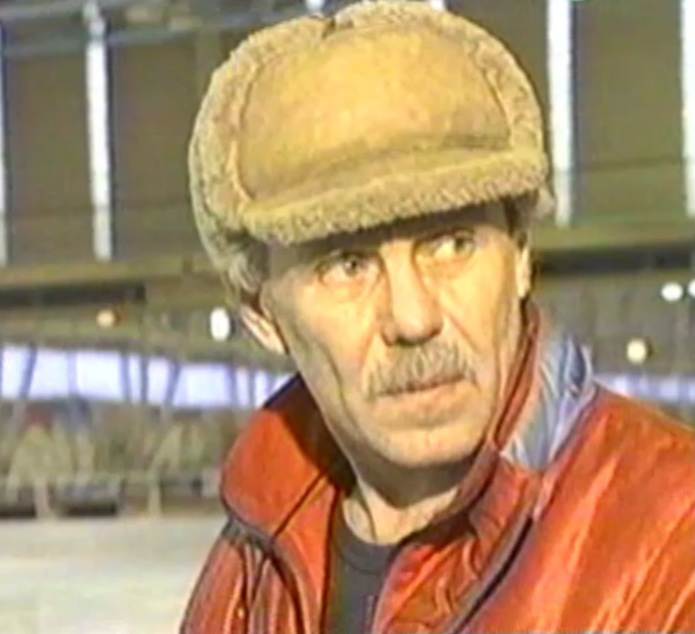

Personal information
- Full name: Edouard Georgievich Pliner
- Born: June 13, 1936 Sverdlovsk, Russian SFSR, Soviet Union
- Died: October 25, 2016 (aged 80)
- Spouse: Evguenia Zelikova (m. 1979)

Figure skating career
- Began skating: 1950

Edouard Georgievich Pliner (Russian: Эдуард Георгиевич Плинер; June 13, 1936 – October 25, 2016) was a Russian figure skating coach.

== Life and career ==
Pliner was born in Sverdlovsk (now Yekaterinburg) in 1936 and started skating at 14 years old. He won the Kirov Cup and was a member of the USSR national team, receiving the title of a Master of Sport (USSR). He graduated from the State Central Institute of Physical Culture (GTSOLIFK) in 1959, earning a master's degree of Sports Science.

During his coaching career, his most notable students were Natalia Bestemianova – 1988 Olympic champion, Kira Ivanova – 1984 Olympic bronze medalist, Anna Kondrashova – 1984 World silver medalist, Natalia Lebedeva – 1989 and 1990 European silver medalist, Yuri Bureiko – 1981 World Junior silver medalist, and Konstantin Kostin – 1992 World Junior silver medalist.

From 1991 to 1992, Pliner worked as a visiting skating coach in Austria, the Netherlands, Czech Republic, Yugoslavia, Germany, and other countries. In 1993, he began working at the Colonial Figure Skating Club (CFSC) in Boxborough, Massachusetts, USA. Pliner was awarded the Gold Pin from the IPSU (International Professional Skating Union). He lived in Littleton, Massachusetts.

Pliner died on October 25, 2016.
