= Betty Jones =

American soprano (1930–2019)

Betty Jones (1930 – November 7, 2019) was an American operatic spinto soprano, who did not begin her career until the age of forty-one.

Jones was born in Plainfield, New Jersey.

Having been an Art major at Sarah Lawrence College, in 1971 Jones made her professional debut in two secondary roles in the Boston Opera Group's production of Louise, staged by Sarah Caldwell, with Carol Neblett in the title role. She then appeared with the Chicago Lyric Opera, as Marianne in Der Rosenkavalier, with Christa Ludwig and Judith Blegen.

Her first major role was the name part of Aida, for the Seattle Opera. Her debut at the New York City Opera occurred in the fall of 1974, as Amelia in Un ballo in maschera. She returned to that company in 1976, for the Contessa in Le nozze di Figaro (opposite Susanne Marsee as Cherubino), Amelia again (conducted by Julius Rudel), and Eva in Die Meistersinger.

Jones also sang in Mexico City (Un ballo in maschera), Wiesbaden (Tosca), Opera/South (Senta in Der fliegende Holländer, conducted by Walter Herbert), Opera Orchestra of New York (Oberon, at Carnegie Hall, with Nicolai Gedda), etc.

In 1982, she performed Odabella in Attila (with Samuel Ramey) for the City Opera, which, following the discovery of a hearing loss, was her Farewell to opera.

She died in Norwalk, Connecticut, on November 7, 2019, at the age of 89.
