= Ethan Stiefel =

American ballet dancer, choreographer and director

- Born: February 13, 1973 (age 53); Tyrone, Pennsylvania, United States
- Occupations: Ballet dancer; choreographer
- Years active: 1989–present
- Spouse: Gillian Murphy (m. 2015)
- Children: 1
- Dancing career
- Former groups: Royal New Zealand Ballet (September 2011 – 2014); American Ballet Theatre (April 1997 – July 2012); New York City Ballet (1989 – April 1997)

Ethan Stiefel (born February 13, 1973) is an American dancer, choreographer, and director. He was a principal dancer with American Ballet Theatre (ABT) from 1997 until July 2012. He was the artistic director of the Royal New Zealand Ballet from 2011 to 2014. His wife is Gillian Murphy, also a principal dancer with ABT.

== Early life and training ==
Born in Tyrone, Pennsylvania, he is the only son of a Lutheran minister who became a prison warden in New York; their last name is pronounced "Shtee-fell" and is German for "boot."

Stiefel began ballet training in Madison, Wisconsin, at the Monona Academy of Dance at age eight. He became involved with classical dance through his older sister Erin, who was taking a class. Before that, both he and his sister took gymnastics classes. His first ballet teacher, Jo Jean Retrum, was interested in getting Ethan to take class because boys in ballet are a rarity. He studied for two years at the Milwaukee Ballet School under Ted Kivitt and Paul Sutherland, and at the Central Pennsylvania Youth Ballet before moving to New York City to attend the School of American Ballet on scholarship.

While there, Stanley Williams enrolled him in the company's men's special class where he trained alongside Rudolf Nureyev, Mikhail Baryshnikov and Fernando Bujones. He studied with Baryshnikov himself at the short-lived Mikhail Baryshnikov's School of Classical Ballet.

== Career ==
=== Dancing ===
He started his dancing career in 1989, when he joined the corps de ballet of New York City Ballet at age 16. In 1992, he took a leave of absence to perform with the Zürich Ballet, under directorship of Bernd R. Bienert, but returned to NYCB a year later as a soloist. By 1995, he was a principal dancer with the company. He ended his tenure with NYCB in April 1997 when he joined ABT as a principal dancer, from which he retired in 2012. He danced with the short-lived Mikhail Baryshnikov School of Classical Ballet at ABT. His dance repertoire includes many key romantic roles in both classical and contemporary ballet.

He won a silver medal at the Prix de Lausanne in 1989 and also received a Princess Grace Foundation-USA grant in 1991. In 1998, Stiefel was nominated for the Benois de la Danse award as one of the rising stars in ballet. In 2007, Stiefel made his debut with the Australian Ballet in Nureyev's staging of Don Quixote, for its Melbourne and Sydney seasons, in the role of Basilio. In 2008, Stiefel was a recipient of the Dance Magazine Award along with Pina Bausch, Sylvia Walters, and Lawrence Rhodes for his role as a leader in the dance field.

Stiefel has appeared as a guest artist with many companies throughout his career including the Mariinsky Ballet, the Royal Ballet, the Australian Ballet, Zurich Ballet, Munich Ballet, Hamburg Ballet, National Ballet of Canada, New National Ballet in Tokyo, and Teatro Colón Ballet in Buenos Aires. He gave his final performance as an ABT principal dancer on July 7, 2012, at the Metropolitan Opera House, as Ali the slave in Le Corsaire. He was widely considered to be "the greatest male ballet dancer in the world or "the most advanced male ballet dancer in the world".

=== Directing and teaching ===
In 2004, he created a four-week workshop, Stiefel & Students, for aspiring dancers where dance students train and perform with professional ballet dancers. It is held annually on Martha's Vineyard in the month of August. The program accepts students aged 12 to 18. Its rollcall of star guest teachers include Stiefel, Johan Kobborg, Amanda McKerrow, Elizabeth Parkinson, Scott Wise, Marcelo Gomes, John Gardner, Gary Chryst, Ann Reinking, and Alina Cojocaru. The program has been on hiatus since 2008.

In late 2005, Ballet Pacifica, based in Irvine, California, named him as its artistic director with the aim to relaunch itself as a higher-profile ballet company. However, after the company failed to raise the funds necessary to support their new vision, its executive director resigned followed by Stiefel himself in April 2006.

He was formerly the dean of the School of Dance at the University of North Carolina School of the Arts in Winston-Salem where he also choreographed a new production of The Nutcracker.

In November 2010 Stiefel was announced as the next director of the Royal New Zealand Ballet. He took up that position in September 2011. Stiefel expanded the international profile of the company, programmed new works, created a one-act ballet Bierhalle, and choreographed a production of Giselle. In March 2014, Stiefel announced that he would not extend his contract with the Royal New Zealand Ballet and would return to the United States.

In November 2020, it was announced that Stiefel will take over the New Jersey–based American Repertory Ballet in July 2021 as artistic director.

=== Television and film appearances ===
In 2000, he starred in the film Center Stage, directed by Nicholas Hytner with original choreography by Susan Stroman and featuring Amanda Schull. He also starred in the sequels Center Stage: Turn It Up and Center Stage: On Pointe. Center Stage features a subplot in which Stiefel's character garners the financial support of a flirtatious female philanthropist (played by Elizabeth Hubbard). An article in The New York Times titled "How Much Is That Dancer in the Program?" revealed that Stiefel has a similar real-life sponsorship relationship with wealthy philanthropist Anka Palitz.

In 2007 he appeared in the film Born to Be Wild – The Leading Men of American Ballet Theatre with Angel Corella, Jose Manuel Carreno and Vladimir Malakhov directed by Judy Kinberg and produced by Jodee Nimerichter.

In 2007, Stiefel appeared in an episode of Queer Eye to meet a "straight guy" who considers Stiefel his "idol." In 2010 he appeared as himself in season 4, episode 8 of Gossip Girl with Murphy.

== Personal life ==
He is an avid motorcyclist. He grew up riding dirt bikes, currently owns a Harley-Davidson Wide Glide and once drove 3,500 miles across the north-eastern US with his then-girlfriend Gillian Murphy riding pillion. He is also a Green Bay Packers and Wisconsin Badgers fan.

Stiefel proposed to Murphy, a principal dancer with American Ballet Company, in May 2011, after they performed in ABT's spring gala. They were married on September 19, 2015. On December 14, 2018, Murphy announced that she was pregnant with her first child and would take maternity leave for the 2018–2019 season. In June 2019, Murphy announced the birth of their son.

== Quotes ==
- "American ballet, for me, is Stanley Williams."
- "Baryshnikov was and is my idol. He's the man. He was someone I've looked up to all throughout my life."
- "I enjoy what I do, so why not just go about it in a good way, a positive way? I don't concern myself with becoming a star. I just go out there and try to give an honest performance and if, when I get offstage, I'm a complete schmuck, then that's me."
- "When I'm done with ballet, I'd just like to work on motorcycles. I have two."
- "I actually quit ballet when I was 14. I had just gotten a scholarship to the School of American Ballet, but it was so far away and there was no other school I liked nearby But then my father was transferred to New York, and ... I knew this was it. I saw the bright lights, big city, the professional companies and great dancers. I was in a great school and knew that this was serious business and I had to do it."
- "Dancing exacts a toll. I don't dance for applause. But there have definitely been moments, when I've been injured, when I say to myself, 'To come back to this, is it really worth it. It's just tough. It takes so much out of you physically and there's a lot of stress involved. Emotionally, it can drain you. I travel around a lot and it's great, it's exciting, but I don't see any of it. I do my shows and I'm off to the next place."
- "I always worry about my line. At the same time, I’m lucky: I have the feet that I’ve been given. Hopefully, they’ll keep pointing for two more shows."
- "Julie [Kent] and I first started working together in the late '90s at ABT. I danced some of my first roles and debuts with her. I think my favorite ballet with Julie was 'Romeo and Juliet'. You never forget your first Juliet."
