= Marcelo Gomes (dancer) =

Brazilian ballet dancer (born 1979)

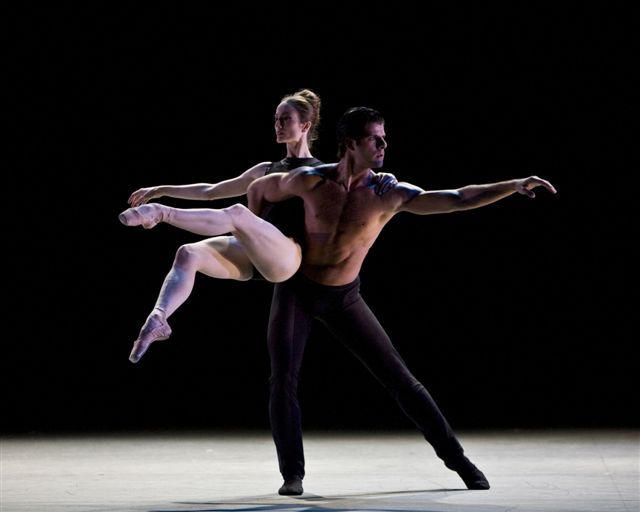
- Gomes dancing with Julie Kent
- Born: Marcelo Mourão Gomes; September 26, 1979 (age 46); Manaus, Amazonas, Brazil
- Occupation: Ballet dancer
- Years active: 1997–present
- Career
- Former groups: American Ballet Theatre

Marcelo Mourão Gomes (born September 26, 1979) is a Brazilian ballet dancer who performed for two decades with the American Ballet Theatre.

== Biography ==
Born in Manaus and raised in Rio de Janeiro, Gomes began his dance studies at the Helena Lobato and Dalal Achcar Ballet Schools. At the age of 13 he left Brazil to attend the Harid Conservatory in Boca Raton, Florida, and at 16 he studied for one year at the Paris Opera Ballet school. He also studied at the schools of the Houston Ballet, Boston Ballet, and Cuballet. Gomes was a Prix de Lausanne winner in 1996.

Gomes first joined the American Ballet Theatre in 1997 as a member of the corps de ballet. He was promoted to soloist in 2000 and to principal dancer in 2002. He was named one of "25 to Watch" in 2001 by Dance Magazine. In 2008 was a winner of one of the most prestigious awards in ballet, the Prix Benois de la Danse in Moscow for his role as Othello in Lar Lubovitch's ballet Othello.

Gomes' performances have been seen throughout the world. In addition to his touring with ABT, he has appeared at many international dance festivals, including the World Ballet Festival in Japan. He has been a guest artist with the Mariinsky Ballet, the Bolshoi Ballet, the Dutch National Ballet, the National Ballet of Canada, the Houston Ballet, the Teatro Colón in Buenos Aires, the Teatro Municipal do Rio de Janeiro, and the New York City Ballet. In the summer of 2008, he accompanied Alessandra Ferri on her farewell tour in Japan and Italy.

Gomes resigned from the ABT on December 21, 2017, after the company began investigating a report of sexual misconduct levied against him.

On 15 September 2018, Gomes married his boyfriend Nicholas Palmquist.

== Roles ==
- Prince Siegfried and Von Rothbart in Swan Lake
- Des Grieux and Lescaut in Manon
- Armand in La Dame aux Camélias
- Romeo in Romeo and Juliet
- Albrecht in Giselle
- Peasant Pas de deux from Giselle
- Conrad, Ali the Slave, and Lankendem in Le Corsaire
- The Prince in Cinderella
- Solor in La Bayadère
- The Bronze Idol in La Bayadere
- Basilio and Espada in Don Quixote
- James in La Sylphide
- Franz in Coppélia
- Othello in Othello
- Prince Désiré in The Sleeping Beauty
- Carabosse in The Sleeping Beauty
- Henry VIII in VIII
- The Moor in Petrouchka
- The Third Sailor in Fancy Free
- The Man from the House Opposite in Pillar of Fire
- Oberon and Lysander in The Dream
- The Man (Heaven) and Fortune in HereAfter
- Danilo and Camille in The Merry Widow
- His Imperial Excellency in Offenbach in the Underworld
- Onegin and Prince Gremin in Onegin
- Jeanne de Brienne and Abderakman in Raymonda
- Rogue in Rabbit and Rogue
- The Swan in Matthew Bourne's Swan Lake

He created Aktaion in Artemis, the Portrait in Dorian, Death in HereAfter, Sergei in On the Dnieper and leading roles in Black Tuesday, C. to C. (Close to Chuck), Clear, Concerto No. 1 for Piano and Orchestra, From Here On Out, and Glow - Stop.

== Reviews ==
- NY Times review of Giselle (June 10, 2009)
- NY Times review of Swan Lake (June 24, 2009)
- NY Times review of Romeo and Juliet (July 8, 2009)
