= Nikolay Tsiskaridze =

Russian ballet dancer (born 1973)

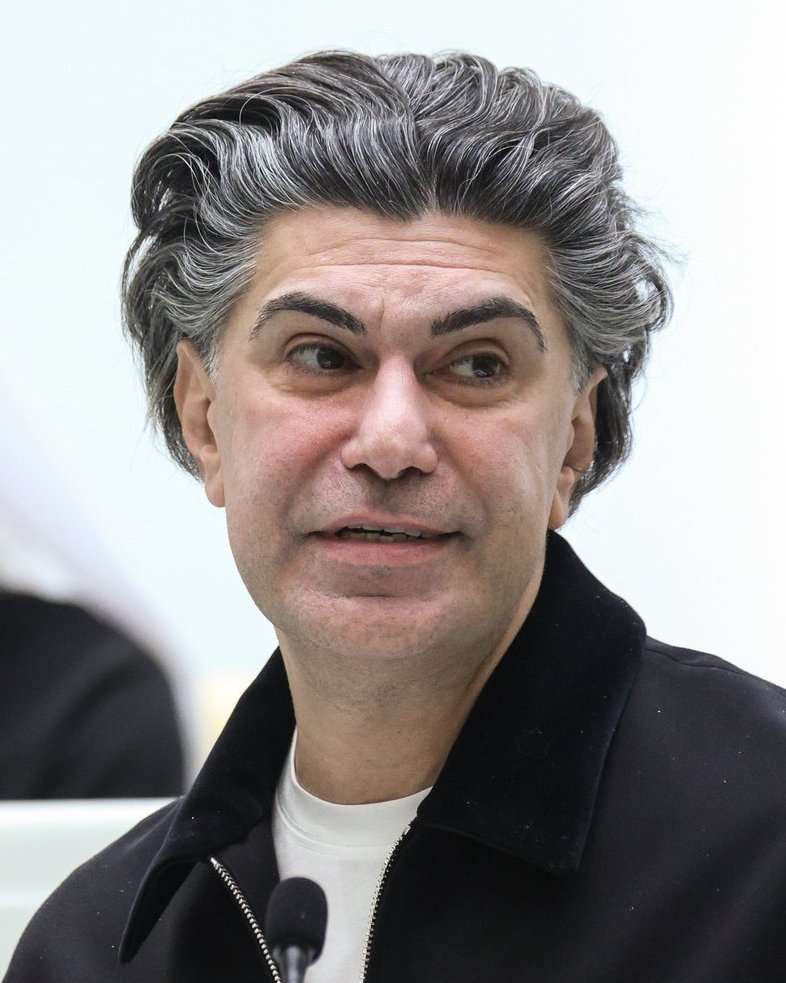
- Born: Nikolay Maximovich Tsiskaridze; 31 December 1973 (age 52); Tbilisi, Georgia, Soviet Union
- Education: Bolshoi Ballet Academy; Kutafin Moscow State Law University
- Occupations: Ballet dancer, ballet teacher, rector
- Years active: 1992–present
- Title: Acting Rector of Vaganova Academy of Russian Ballet (2013–2014); Rector of Vaganova Academy of Russian Ballet (2014–present)
- Honours: Chevalier Ordre des Arts et des Lettres; People's Artist of Russia; Honoured Artist of Russia; State Prize of the Russian Federation; Order of Honour of the Republic of Georgia

Signature
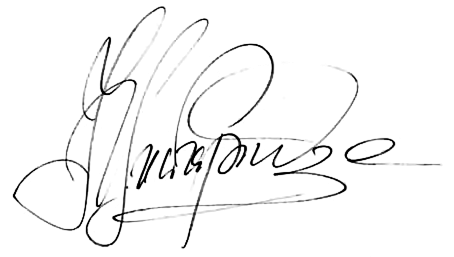

Nikolay Maximovich Tsiskaridze PAR (Russian: Николай Максимович Цискаридзе; Georgian: ნიკოლოზ ცისკარიძე, Nik'oloz Cisk'aridze) is a Russian ballet dancer who was a member of the Bolshoi Ballet for 21 years (1992–2013).

== Biography ==
=== Early years ===
Nikolay Tsiskaridze was born in Tbilisi, Soviet Georgia in 1973. He was the first-born child of Lamara Nikolayevna Tsiskaridze, who was 42 years old when he was born. He grew up without knowing his father. His mother was a physicist, and she worked at Obninsk Nuclear Power Plant, then as a teacher at Tbilisi public school №162. Five years after his mother's death an aunt revealed Tsiskaridze's father was a brother of their neighbor, a violinist, who lived next door for almost 20 years, a fact he was unaware of.

=== Career in ballet ===
Tsiskaridze began his dance studies at the Tbilisi Ballet School in 1984. Though initially his mother was reluctant to let her son dance, his teachers eventually convinced her of his talent after which she whole-heartedly supported his pursuit of a ballet career. She saved up enough money and took him to Moscow for auditions. In 1987, he joined the Moscow Ballet School and studied under the guidance of Pyotr Pestov. After graduating in 1992, Tsiskaridze joined the ballet company of the Bolshoi Theatre, then under the direction of Yury Grigorovich. In Bolshoi, Tsiskaridze was coached by Galina Ulanova and Marina Semyonova. He was promoted to the position of principal dancer in 1995. Since then, Tsiskaridze has performed internationally with a number of ballet companies across the world, including the Mariinsky Ballet and Paris Opera Ballet. He also participated in most of the foreign tours of the Bolshoi Ballet, "Kings of the Dance" international project, Les Saisons Russes du XXI Siecle.

Over the course of his dance career, he performed over seventy roles in major classical works, as well as ballets by modern choreographers. While dancing, Tsiskaridze studied at the Pedagogical faculty of the Institute of Choreography in 1996. Since 2003, he has taught a daily ballet class at the Bolshoi Theatre, and began also teaching at the Moscow Ballet Academy in 2004.

In October 2003, Tsiskaridze faced a major injury which threatened to end his career. During the rehearsal at Opera de Paris, he tore the cruciate ligament. An operation on the knee was followed by a major staphylococci infection. After 9 more operations, he achieved complete recovery and returned to the stage after a nine-month intermission.

Tsiskaridze has appeared in many reality shows and been a judge on Russia's version of Dancing with the Stars for several years.

=== Awards ===
Tsiskaridze has received many awards and accolades: he became the youngest person to be named a People's Artist of Russia (2001). He received “Soul of the Dance” prize (1994), the State Prize of the Russian Federation (2001, 2003), the Prix Benois de la Danse (1999), Silver medal at the Osaka Ballet Competition (1995), Golden medal at the Moscow Ballet Competition (1997), Honoured Artist of Russia (1997), Russian Golden Mask theatrical prize (1998, 2000, 2003), Order of Honour of the Republic of Georgia (2003), Danza&Danza award as best dancer of the year 2003, Triumph prize (2004), Chevalier de l'Ordre des Arts et des Lettres de la République Française (2006), People's Artist of North Osetia — Alania Republic (2013) etc.

=== Filin assault scandal ===
In 2011, Tsiskaridze was a contender for directorship in Bolshoi, but Sergei Filin was chosen to the post. On 30 June 2013, Tsiskaridze left the Bolshoi when his contracts (as a premier dancer and as a ballet teacher) expired and the management decided not to extend them. His relationship with the directors of the theatre had become tense long ago. Tsiskaridze openly criticized the theatre's management for soiling the Bolshoi's repertoire of classics with contemporary works from abroad, for favoritism and bad taste. As a result of his criticism, Tsiskaridze and his students were denied roles, docked pay and prevented from advancing their careers. Tsiskaridze openly criticized the management for a six-year £800m-plus renovation of the theatre that turned out to be of a very low quality and raised serious concerns on theft, corruption, and incompetence.

In January 2013, the acting artistic director of the Bolshoi Ballet Sergei Filin was assaulted, sulphuric acid was thrown into his face. Tsiskaridze was one of the suspects, but he had a strong alibi on the day of the assault. Though the former soloist of Bolshoi Pavel Dmitrichenko confessed to pay for the assault, many believed his confession was forced, and someone staged the whole attack to ruin Tsiskaridze's reputation and get him away from the theatre.

=== Public positions ===
In July 2011, Tsiskaridze was appointed a member of the President's Council for Culture and Arts.

In October 2013, Tsiskaridze was appointed a director of the Vaganova Academy of Russian Ballet in Saint Petersburg (est. in 1738) by order of the Culture Minister. In a year he was promoted to the full Rector of the institution.

In 2014, Tsiskaridze graduated as a Master of Law at Kutafin Moscow State Law University.

In March 2014, he signed a letter in support of the position of the President of Russia Vladimir Putin on Russia's military intervention in Ukraine.

On 29 November 2014, Tsiskaridze was formally confirmed as a Rector of the Vaganova Academy in an unopposed election, winning 227 of the 244 possible votes which include professors, students, and school canteen workers. Even though his appointment a year earlier caused a scandal, Tsiskaridze won the support of the staff with his hard work and significant results – improving the quality of education at the Academy, raising the funds for the school equipment and furnishing, negotiating various collaborations with other schools and theatres, bringing the new repertoire broadening the range of opportunities for graduates.

The trustees of Tokyo Ballet Academy have granted to Nikolay Tsiskaridze the status of professor emeritus. The artistic director of Tokyo Ballet Academy, Dr. Etsuro Satomi, signed the letter about it on 11 February 2015.

== Repertoire ==
Tsiskaridze danced in more than 70 ballets, including:

- Nutcracker Suite: Prince, Poupée Française
- La Belle au bois dormant: Prince Désiré, l'Oiseau Bleu, Fée Carabosse, Prince Fortune
- Romeo and Juliet: Mercutio, a troubadour
- La Sylphide: James
- Swan Lake: Prince Siegfried, Rothbart, the King
- La Bayadere: Solor, Bronze Idol
- The Legend of Love: Ferkhad
- Giselle: Albrecht
- The Spectre of the Rose: Le Spectre
- Raymonda: Jean de Brienne
- La Fille du pharaon: Taor
- La Dame de pique: Hermann
- Notre-Dame de Paris: Quasimodo
- Le Clair Ruisseau: Danseur classique
- A Midsummer Night's Dream: Theseus
- Le Corsaire: Conrad
- La Rose Malade

== Gallery ==
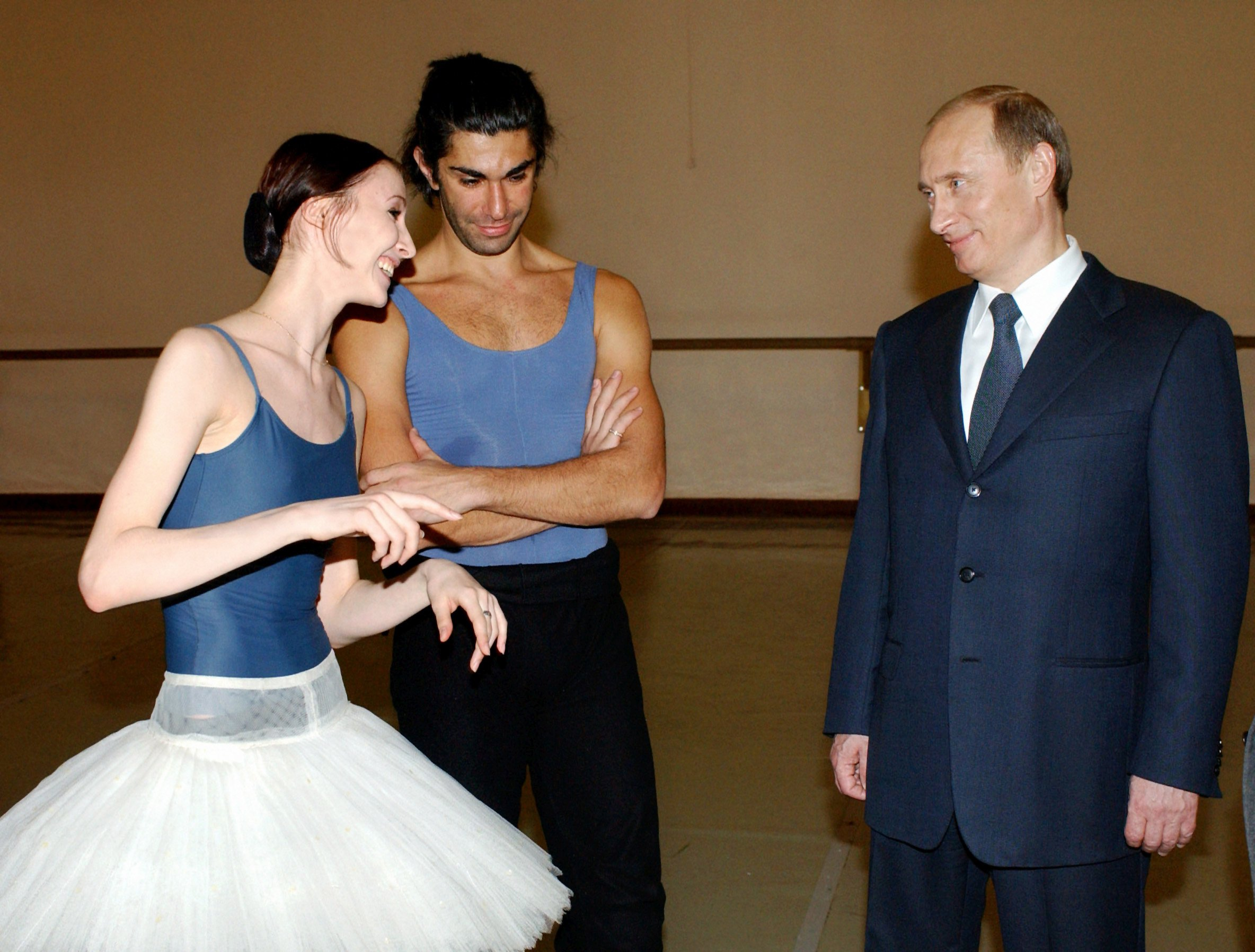

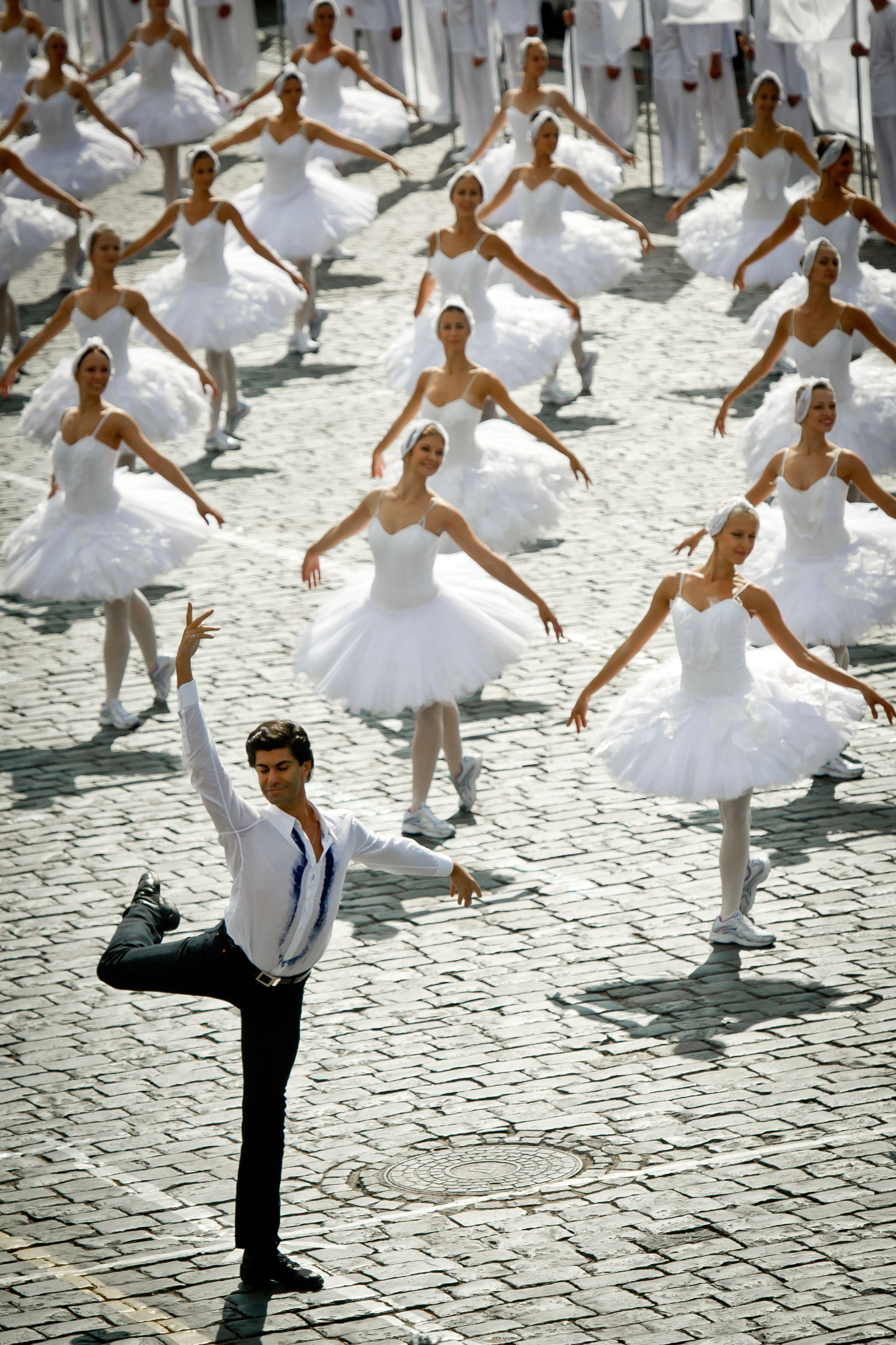

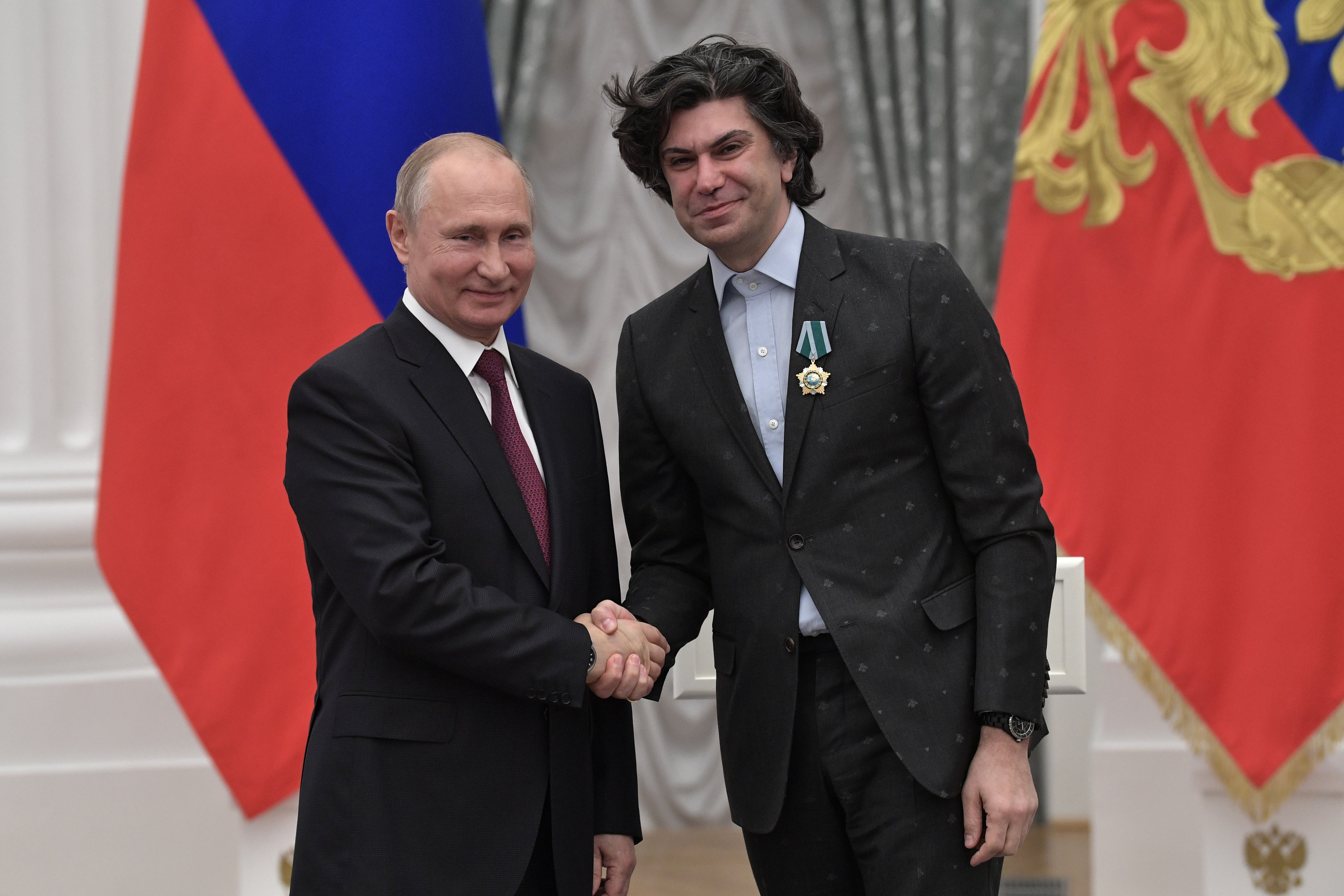

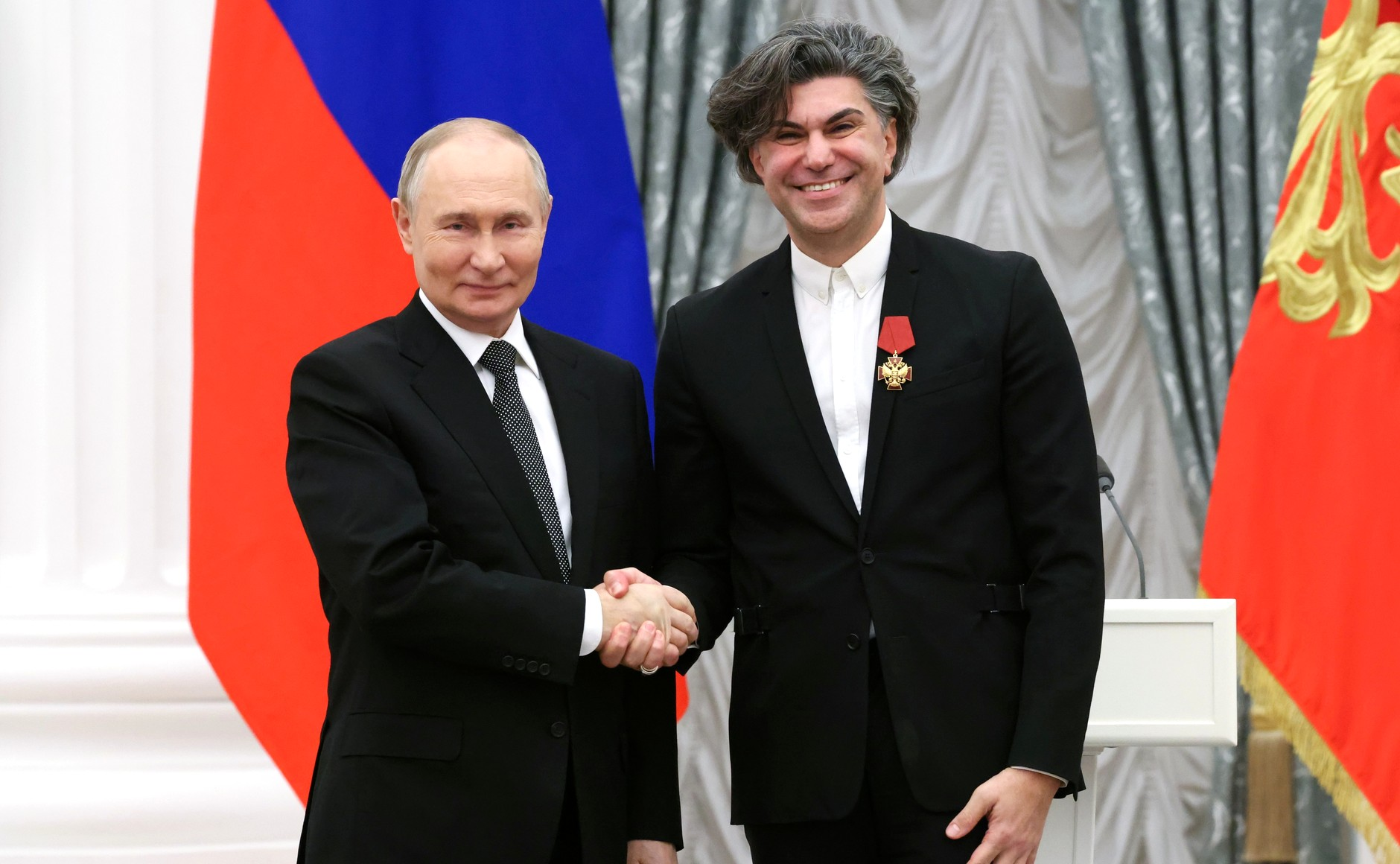
