= Asian Cultural Council =

U.S.-based non-profit organization

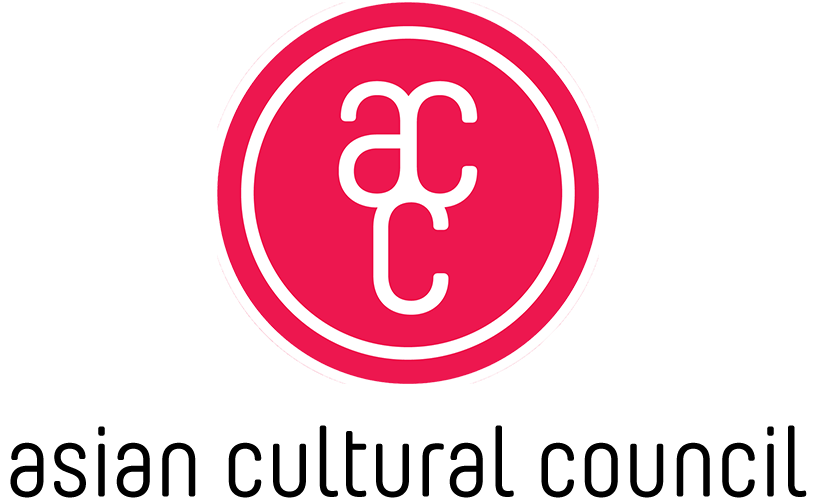

- Geographical purview of the ACC (Afghanistan and Pakistan are not shown)
- Abbreviation: ACC
- Formation: 1980 (1963 - 1979 as Asian Cultural Program of the JDR 3rd Fund)
- Type: 501(c)(3) Non-profit
- Tax ID no.: 13-3018822
- Purpose: Cultural exchange
- Headquarters: New York City
- Location(s): New York City; Hong Kong; Manila; Taipei; Tokyo
- Region served: United States and Asia
- Official language: English
- Chairman: Wendy O'Neill
- Website: www.asianculturalcouncil.org

Asian Cultural Council

Chinese name
- Traditional Chinese: 亞洲文化協會
- Simplified Chinese: 亚洲文化协会
Transcriptions
Standard Mandarin
- Hanyu Pinyin: Yàzhōu Wénhuà Xiéhuì
Yue: Cantonese
- Yale Romanization: Ajāu Màhnfa Hipwúi

Korean name
- Hangul: 아시아 문화 협회

Japanese name
- Hiragana: アジアン・カルチュラル・カウンシル

The Asian Cultural Council (ACC) is a non-profit organization dedicated to advancing international cultural exchange between Asia and the U.S. and between the countries of Asia through the arts. Founded by John D. Rockefeller III in 1963, ACC has invested over $100 million in grants to artists and arts professionals representing 16 fields and 26 countries through over 6,000 exchanges. ACC supports $1.4 million in grants annually for individuals and organizations.

ACC awards fellowship grants to artists and scholars and project grants for organizations in three categories of cross-cultural exchange: Asia-to-U.S., U.S.-to-Asia, and intra-Asia. The programming of each grant is customized to the goals of the grant recipient.

ACC is both a grantmaking and grantseeking organization. It is supported by funding from individuals, foundations, and corporations including the Andrew W. Mellon Foundation, Beijing Contemporary Art Foundation, Ford Foundation, the Henry Luce Foundation, Mandarin Oriental Hotel Group, Newman's Own Foundation and The Starr Foundation.

ACC is headquartered in New York City with regional offices and affiliate foundations in Hong Kong (ACC Hong Kong Foundation, est. 2015), Manila (ACC Philippines Foundation, est. 2000), Taipei (ACC Taiwan Foundation, est. 1995), and Tokyo (ACC Japan Foundation, est. 2018).

== History ==
=== The Asian Cultural Program of the JDR 3rd Fund (1963–1980) ===
The JDR 3rd Fund was incorporated in 1963 as a private non-profit by John D. Rockefeller 3rd "to stimulate, encourage, promote, and support activities important to human welfare." The Asian Cultural Program of the JDR 3rd Fund—precursor to the Asian Cultural Council—was established to promote cultural exchange in the arts between the United States and Asia. ACC’s founding director, Porter McCray, was the former director of circulating exhibitions at the Museum of Modern Art in New York City. Through the 1960s, the Asian Cultural Program of the JDR 3rd Fund made 80 to 100 grants annually to artists, scholars, students and institutions. Richard S. Lanier succeeded Porter McCray as director in 1975.

Archives concerning the JDR 3rd Fund, the Asian Cultural Program, and the Asian Cultural Council can be found at the Rockefeller Archive Center.

=== The Asian Cultural Council (1980–) ===
Following the death of John D. Rockefeller 3rd in 1978, the Asian Cultural Program became the Asian Cultural Council (ACC) and was established as a publicly supported operating foundation. Blanchette Hooker Rockefeller, wife of John D. Rockefeller 3rd, became ACC’s first Chairman and Elizabeth J. McCormack, director of the Rockefeller Philanthropy Office, became Vice President. Subsequent directors were Ralph Samuelson (1991–2008), Jennifer P. Goodale (2008–2013) and Miho Walsh (2013–2020), and ACC's current executive director is Judy Kim.

== Leadership ==
- Chairman: Josie Cruz Natori
- Executive Director: Judy Kim
- ACC Hong Kong Foundation Limited Chairman: Daphne King
- ACC Taiwan Foundation Chairman: Douglas Tong Hsu
- ACC Japan Foundation Chairman: Kazuko Aso
- ACC Philippines Foundation Inc. Chairman: Ernest L. Escaler

== Programs ==
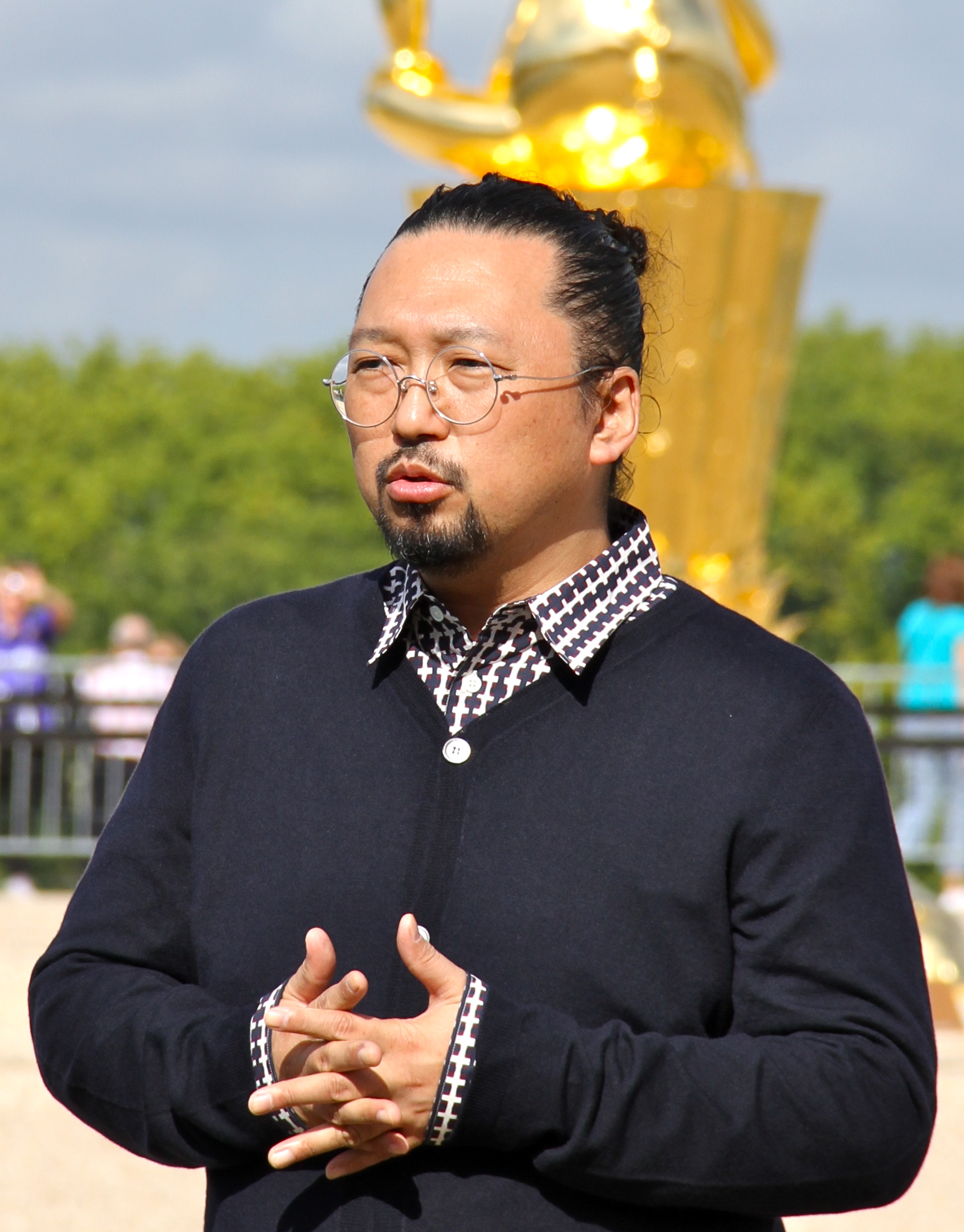
ACC Grantee, Japanese contemporary artist Takashi Murakami, at Versailles in September 2010

ACC provides grants for individual fellowships, projects and organizations, graduate studies, and travel. They support activities that involve cultural immersion; cross-cultural engagement; and relationship building, collaboration, or exchange of best practices among arts professionals. In addition to funding, it is common for grantees to receive mentoring and personal introductions, and access to an international network of alumni.

ACC provides grants from Asia to the U.S., the U.S. to Asia, and intra-Asia. Regions include: Afghanistan, Bangladesh, Bhutan, Brunei, Cambodia, China, East Timor, Hong Kong, India, Indonesia, Japan, Korea, Laos, Macau, Malaysia, Mongolia, Myanmar, Nepal, Pakistan, the Philippines, Singapore, Sri Lanka, Taiwan, Thailand, the United States, and Vietnam.

Fields include: archaeology, architecture, art history, arts administration, arts criticism, conservation, crafts, curation, dance, ethnomusicology, film/video/photography, literature, museum studies, music, theater, and visual arts.

In addition to grants, ACC organizes public programs to facilitate understanding and dialogue around cultural exchange. This includes forums, convenings, and public programs such as the East-West Dialogue series, Cultural Conversations, and inDialogue. In 2000 and 2003, ACC organized Forums on Arts and Culture in the Mekong Region with funding from the Rockefeller Foundation, and in 2017, the ACC Forum: Making the Case for Cultural Exchange through funding by the Henry Luce Foundation. In 2018, ACC, La MaMa E.T.C., and Beijing Contemporary Art Foundation co-organized a panel on international artist residences.

East-West Dialogue is an annual lecture series engaging leaders from the arts and cultural fields in Asia and the West. It was established in 2013 through an endowment gift from Tsuneko and Shoji Sadao. Speakers have included author Pico Iyer, writer and editor Ian Buruma, American theater director Peter Sellars, Japanese architect Fumihiko Maki (ACC 1976), president of Japan Society of Boston Peter Grilli, and architect Kengo Kuma (ACC 1985). In 2021, ACC hosted its first online festival East West Fest, culminating in an East-West Dialogue with Pultizer Prize-winning author Viet Thanh Nguyen (ACC 2010) and multidisciplinary artist Tiffany Chung (ACC 2015).

Cultural Conversations is an in-house lecture series that features ACC alumni and their work. Conversations have been led by alumni such as wooden boat builder Douglas Brooks (ACC multiple grants 2008-2017), Shiro Nakane and the Japan Society (ACC multiple grants 1964-2015), artist Oscar Oiwa (ACC 2001), shamisen performer Hidejiro Honjo (ACC 2016), Taiwanese choreographer Cheng Tsung-lung (ACC 2011), composer Matt Welch (ACC 2016), and scholar Urmila Mohan (ACC 2018).

In 2020, ACC launched inDialogue, an online public program series aimed at maintaining international connectivity during the pandemic and beyond. Speakers have included poet-lawyer Reginald Dwayne Betts, fiber and social practice artist Aram Han Sifuentes (ACC 2019), visual artist Weston Teruya (ACC 2018), playwrights Candace Chong Mui Ngam (ACC 2004, 2012) and David Henry Hwang (ACC 2011, 2012), artist Koki Tanaka (ACC 2003), musician Kyaw Kyaw Naing, and multidisciplinary artist Leeroy New (ACC 2015).

=== Program timeline ===
Below is a list of ACC programs. Those established through an initial donation, grant, or endowment have funding individuals or organizations noted in parentheses.

1983: ACC Japan-United States Program (Seiji Tsutsumi and the Seibu Saison group)

- Ford Foundation Fellowship Program for individuals documenting and preserving the traditional arts of Asia (Ford Foundation)
- Starr Foundation Visual Arts Program for artists and art specialists from Asia to travel to the United States (Starr Foundation)

1984: Samuel H. Kress Foundation Fellowships for American art history students conducting dissertation research in Asia (Samuel H. Kress Foundation)

1985: The Humanities Fellowship Program for American scholars and students carrying out research in Asia (National Endowment for the Humanities)

1986 The Hong Kong Arts Program—now called the China, Hong Kong and Macau Program—for artists, students and scholars from Hong Kong to research, study and create work in the United States (Asian Oceanic Group, British American Tobacco Company (Hong Kong) Limited and the Lee Hysan Foundation)

1987: The Asian Art and Religion Fellowship Program for American scholars, specialists and artists to undertake research and projects in Asia involving the intersection or religion and the arts (Laurance S. Rockefeller Jr.)

1993: The Indonesian Museum Development Program—organized in collaboration with the Nusantara Jaya Foundation and the Indonesia Directorate of Museums—for Indonesian museum professionals to intern in the United States and to help with museum workshop programs in Indonesia (Ford Foundation)

1994:

- The Blanchette Hooker Rockefeller Fellowship Fund Committee was organized in Japan to establish an endowment honoring the memory of the late Blanchette Hooker Rockefeller
- ACC Residency Program in Asia for American scholars, artists, and professionals to research, teach, and partake in residencies in Asia (Freeman Foundation)

1995:

- ACC’s Taiwan Fellowship Program for the exchange of artists, scholars, and specialists between Taiwan and the United States, as well as Taiwan and other countries in Asia (Sino-American Foundation, now the ACC Taiwan Foundation)
- China On-Site Seminar Program for the exchange of American and Chinese art history students (Henry Luce Foundation)
- Ock Rang Cultural Foundation Fellowship Program for cultural exchange between Korea and the U.S. and Korea and other countries in Asia

1997:

- The Cambodian Artists Mentorship Program to support performing arts training programs at the Royal University of Fine Arts in Phnom Penh (Rockefeller Foundation)
- The Indonesia Cultural Management Assistance Project to support the management of cultural institutions in Indonesia (Ford Foundation)

2000:

- The Philippines Fellowship Program for the exchange of artists, scholars, and specialists between the Philippines and the U.S., and the Philippines and other countries in Asia (ACC Philippines Foundation)

2001: The Mekong Region Fellowship Program to assist individual artists, scholars, and specialists from Burma, Cambodia, Laos, Thailand, Vietnam, and China’s Yunnan Province to undertake research, training and creative projects in the United States or Asia (Rockefeller Foundation)

2005: The Mandarin Oriental Fellowship to support the preservation of indigenous arts, cultures, and traditions of Asia (Mandarin Oriental Foundation)

2007: American Artists and Museum Professionals Program (Henry Luce Foundation)

2008: The Starr Foundation Performing Arts Program for individuals and institutions working in the contemporary performing arts in Asia to travel to the United States (The Starr Foundation)

2011: Arts in Action Program to support arts communities in need of assistance for rebuilding after natural disasters (Mikimoto)

2012: The Elizabeth J. McCormack Fund was established as an endowment to support the general operations of ACC

2019: The ACC/BCAF Contemporary Arts Fellowship Program for exchange of artists from China and the United States (Beijing Contemporary Art Foundation)

== John D. Rockefeller 3rd Award ==
The John D. Rockefeller 3rd Award is given to individuals from Asia or the U.S. who have made significant contributions to the international understanding, practice, or study of the visual or performing arts of Asia.

=== Past awardees ===
- 1970: Richard Bartholomew, New Delhi, India
- 1986: John M. Rosenfield, Abby Aldrich Rockefeller Professor of Fine Arts, Harvard University
- 1987: José Maceda, chairman, Department of Music, Research College of Music, University of the Philippines
- 1988: James R. Brandon, professor, Department of Drama and Theatre, University of Hawai’i at Manoa
- 1990: Sherman E. Lee, former director, The Cleveland Museum of Art
- 1991: Chou Wen-chung, director, Center for U.S.-China Arts Exchange, Columbia University
- 1992: Kapila Vatsyayan, director, Indira Gandhi National Centre for the Arts, New Delhi
- 1993: Donald Richie, Film critic and writer, Tokyo
- 1995: Setsu Asakura, Stage designer, Tokyo
- 1996: Ma Chengyuan, director, Shanghai Museum
- 1997: Beate Gordon, Arts consultant and writer, New York
- 1998: Nguyen Van Huy, director, Vietnam Museum of Ethnology, Hanoi
- 1999: Proeung Chhieng, dean, Faculty of Choreographic Arts, Royal University of Fine Arts, Phnom Penh
- 2000: Ellen Stewart, founder and artistic director, La MaMa Experimental Theater Club, New York
- 2002: Yang Meiqi, founder, Guangdong Modern Dance Company, Guangzhou
- 2003: Judy Mitoma, director, Center for Intercultural Performance, University of California, Los Angeles
- 2005: Mella Jaarsma, Nindityo Adipurnomo, Founders, Cemeti Art House, Yogyakarta
- 2006: Lin Hwai-min, Artistic Director, Cloud Gate Dance Theater, Taipei
- 2007: Nestor O. Jardin, president, Cultural Center of the Philippines, Manila
- 2008: Ratan Thiyam, founder and Director, Chorus Repertory Theatre, Manipur
- 2010: Samina Quraeshi, Writer, Artist, Designer, Shepard/Quraeshi Associates, Inc., Boston
- 2013: Amna Kusumo, director, Yayasan Kelola, Jakarta
- 2013: Pichet Klunchun, Choreographer and Dancer, Phichet Klunchun Dance Company, Thailand
- 2013: Chinary Ung, Composer, Composers Institute in Asia; University of California, San Diego
- 2015: Duk-Hyung Yoo, president, Seoul Institute of the Arts, Seoul
- 2017: Shen Wei, founder, Shen Wei Dance Arts
- 2019: Kengo Kuma, Architect, Kengo Kuma & Associates
- 2021: Midori, Voilinist, Educator, Osaka
- 2021: Cai Guo-Qiang, Artist, Quangzhou Fujian
- 2024: Takashi Murakami, Artist, Founder and President Kaikai Kiki Co., Ltd.

== Blanchette Hooker Rockefeller Award ==
The Asian Cultural Council established the Blanchette Hooker Rockefeller Award in 2009 in honor of its first Chairman, Blanchette Hooker Rockefeller, wife of John D. Rockefeller 3rd. The Blanchette Hooker Rockefeller Award honors the generosity of the enlightened individuals who believe ACC’s mission of furthering international dialogue, understanding, and respect between Asia and the U.S. through the transformative experience of cultural exchange.

=== Past awardees ===
- 2009: Dr. Deanna Ruth Tak Yung Rudgard, OBE, Non-executive Director, Hysan Development Company Limited
- 2012: Seiji Tsutsumi, president, The Saison Foundation
- 2018: Hans Michael Jebsen, chairman, Jebsen & Co. Ltd., ACCHK Chairman
- 2019: Elizabeth J. McCormack, chairman emeritus, Asian Cultural Council

== Artistic Advisory Council ==
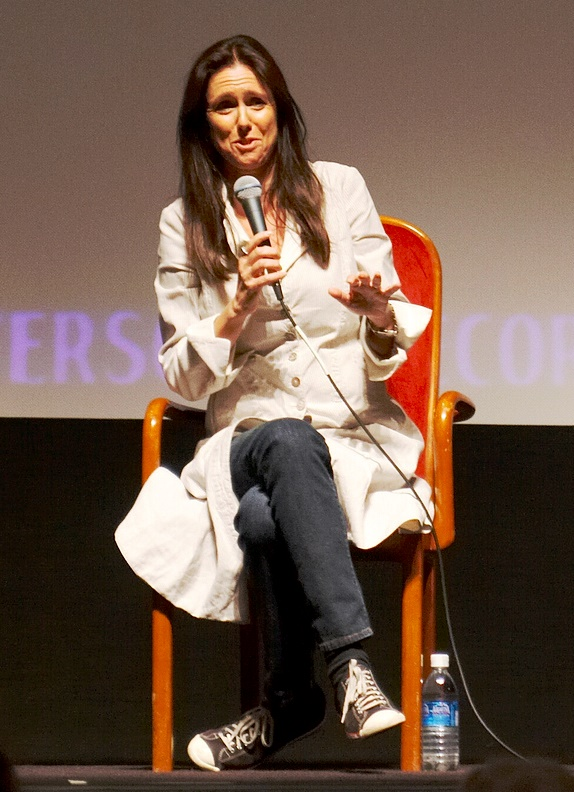
ACC Grantee, American film and theater director and writer Julie Taymor

- Yael Buencamino (Philippines)
- Cai Guo-Qiang, Visual Art (ACC 1995 & 2006, China/U.S.)
- Tiffany Chung, Visual Art (ACC 2015, U.S./Vietnam)
- Patrick Flores, Museum Studies (ACC 2009, Philippines)
- Oscar Ho, Visual Art (ACC 1992, Hong Kong)
- David Henry Hwang, Theater (ACC 2012, U.S.)
- Jin Xing, Dance (ACC 1988, China)
- Kengo Kuma, Architecture (ACC 1985, Japan)
- Dinh Q. Le, Visual Art (ACC 2004, Vietnam/U.S.)
- Barbara London, Film, Video, and Photography (ACC 1995 & 1997, U.S.)
- Fumihiko Maki, Architecture (ACC 1976, Japan)
- Meredith Monk, Theater (ACC 1997 & 2000, U.S.)
- Kohei Nawa, Visual Art (ACC 2004, Japan)
- Jan Leeroy New, Visual Art (ACC 2015, Philippines)
- Viet Thanh Nguyen, Film, Video, and Photography (ACC 2010, U.S.)
- Ong Keng Sen, Theater (ACC 1993, Singapore)
- Mallika Sarabhai, Arts General (ACC 2002, India)
- Sheu Fang-Yi, Dance (ACC 2006, Taiwan)
- Louisa So Yuk Wa, Theater (ACC 2008, Hong Kong)
- Julie Taymor, Theater (ACC 1980, U.S.)
- Tran Luong, Visual Art (ACC 1998 & 2008, Vietnam)
- Apichatpong Weerasethakul, Film, Video, and Photography (ACC 2004, Thailand)
- Robert Wilson, Theater (ACC 1981 & 2004, U.S.)
