= Sang Jijia =

Chinese dancer and choreographer

Sang Jijia (Chinese: 桑吉加) is a Chinese dancer and choreographer, and artistic director of the Hong Kong City Contemporary Dance Company.

Sang was a dancer with Guangdong Modern Dance Company and City Contemporary Dance Company in the 1990s. He then studied with William Forsythe and worked with The Forsythe Company as a choreographer and dancer until 2006, subsequently becoming Resident Artist of BeijingDance / LDTX and Guangdong Modern Dance Company. He became an honorary fellow of the Hong Kong Academy for Performing Arts in 2023. He was appointed artistic director of the City Contemporary Dance Company in 2025.
