= The Group 1965 =

Japanese art collective

- Formation: 1994
- Type: Contemporary artist group (painting, installation, performance)
- Headquarters: Tokyo
- Location(s): Tokyo and New York
- Members: 6 artists, 1 manager
- Official language: Japanese, English

The Group 1965 (in Japanese: 昭和40年会 or Showa 40 Nenkai) is a Japanese contemporary art group formed by Makoto Aida, Sumihisa Arima, Parco Kinoshita, Hiroyuki Matsukage, Oscar Oiwa, and Tsuyoshi Ozawa.

== Selected exhibitions ==
A partial list of exhibitions since 1994:

- 1994 – Press conference performance, NHK Studio, Tokyo
- 1994 – Nasubi Gallery: Showa 40 Nenkai (The Group 1965), Roppongi Wave, Tokyo
- 1996 – The Group 1965 Performance, lecture, workshop, Takamatsu City Museum of Art, Ehime
- 1997–98 – The Group 1965 - The Voices from Tokyo, Galeria Metropolitana de Barcelona, Barcelona, Spain / Galerie Espace Flon, Lausanne, Switzerland / ACC Galerie Weimar, Weimar, Germany
- 1999 – The Group 1965 - The Voices from Tokyo, Contemporary Art Factory, Tokyo
- 1999 – Shine or Rain, Nadiff, Tokyo
- 2000 – The Group 1965 in Osaka, Gallery Kodama, Osaka
- 2005 – 40 x40 Project: 40 (Sa Sip) exhibition Alternative Space Loop, Club Latino, Seoul
- 2005 –BankART Life, BankART Studio NYK, Yokohama
- 2005 – 40 x 40 project: The Group 1965 Seven Samurais, Even, Hiroshima City Museum of Contemporary Art, Hiroshima
- 2008 –The Group 1965's Tokyo Guide, Nadiff apart, Tokyo
- 2011 – We are boys! Künsthalle Düsseldorf, Germany
- 2011 – The Group 1965 Arsenalle Kyiv, Ukraine
- 2013 – We are boys! Kamada benefit society museum of local history, Sakaide, Kagawa
- 2013 – The Group 1965 Ogi-school Setouchi Triennale 2013, Ogishima, Takamatsu, Kagawa
- 2016 – The Group 1965 Ogi-school Setouchi Triennale 2016, Ogishima, Takamatsu, Kagawa
