= Ma Ke =

Ma Ke may refer to:

- Ma Ke (composer) (1918–1976), Chinese composer and musicologist
- Ma Ke (fashion designer) (born 1971), Chinese fashion designer
- Ma Ke (producer), Hong Kong film producer
- Ma Ke (actor) (born 1990), Chinese actor
