= Shen Wei =

Chinese-born American choreographer, visual artist and director (born 1968)

- 沈伟
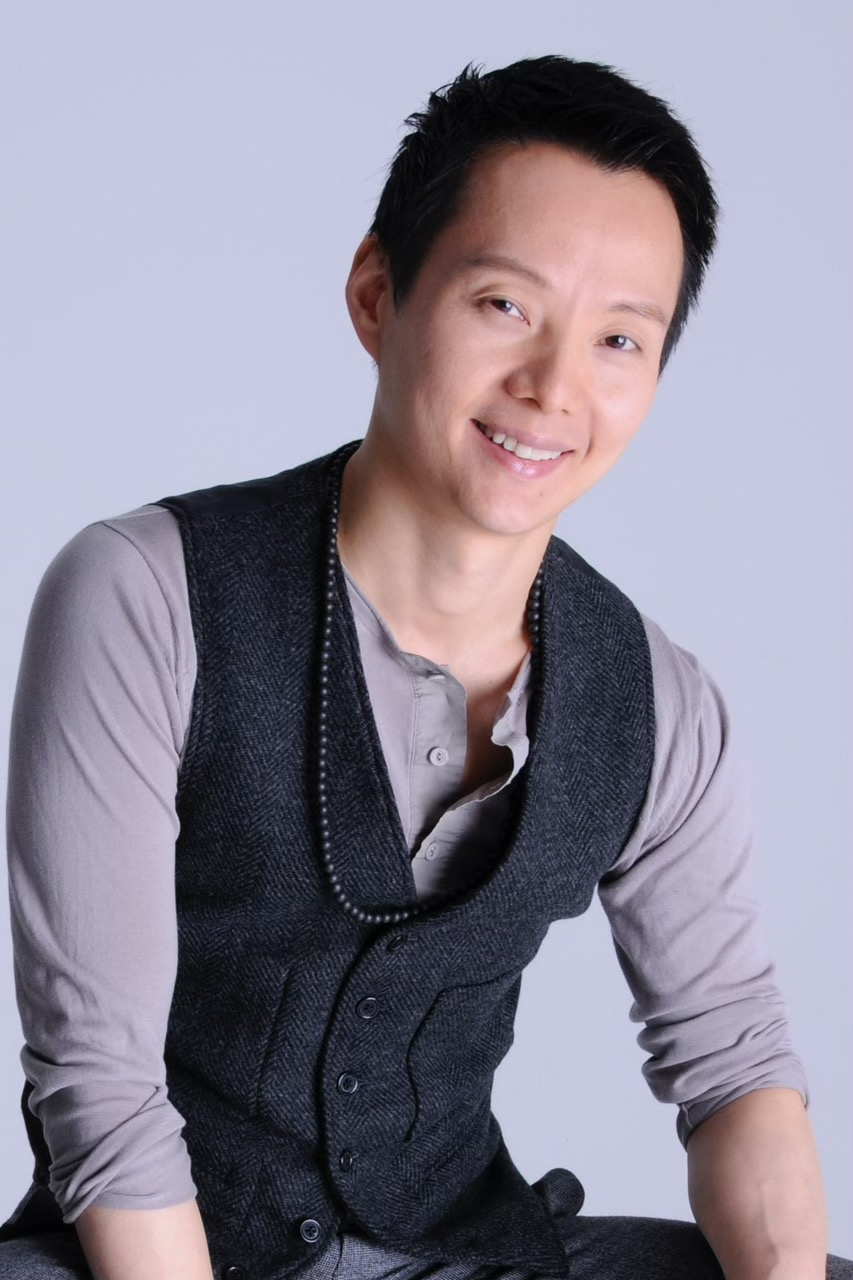
- Shen Wei in 2021
- Born: 1968 (age 57–58); Hunan, China
- Occupations: Choreographer; painter; director
- Years active: 1984–present
- Known for: Founder and Artistic Director of Shen Wei Dance Arts; Choreography for 2008 Beijing Olympics Opening Ceremony
- Notable work: Folding; Rite of Spring; Connect Transfer; Re-Triptych; Undivided Divided
- Awards: MacArthur Fellowship (2007); Samuel H. Scripps/American Dance Festival Award (2022); Nijinsky Award (2004); ISPA Distinguished Artist Award (2022)
- Website: www.shenwei.art

Shen Wei (simplified Chinese: 沈伟; traditional Chinese: 沈偉; pinyin: shěn wěi; born 1968) is a Chinese-American choreographer, painter, and artistic director based in New York City. He is known for founding Shen Wei Dance Arts in 2000 and for choreographing the opening segment of the 2008 Beijing Summer Olympics Opening Ceremony.

Shen's multidisciplinary work incorporates dance, painting, sound, sculpture, theater, and video. Critics have highlighted his syncretic style, combining elements of Eastern and Western aesthetics and blending performance art with visual installation.

His original movement technique, which he terms "Natural Body Development," emphasizes breath, proprioception, and fluidity. Since 2011, Shen has expanded his practice to include large-scale multimedia productions integrating installation art, video, and animation.

He has received major commissions from the Park Avenue Armory, Metropolitan Museum of Art, Lincoln Center Festival, and Teatro dell'Opera di Roma, and has created works for companies including Les Ballets de Monte-Carlo and Les Grands Ballets Canadiens. In 2008, he choreographed an haute couture show in Paris for Chinese designer Ma Ke.

Shen Wei's honors include the Nijinsky Award for Emerging Choreographer (2004), a MacArthur Fellowship (2007), and the Samuel H. Scripps/American Dance Festival Award for Lifetime Achievement (2022).

== Early life ==
=== Family background and early education ===
Shen Wei was born in 1968 in Hunan, China, into an artistically inclined family during the period of the Cultural Revolution. His father was a Chinese opera director, performer, and calligrapher, while his mother worked as a theatrical producer. His two brothers also became visual artists.

At the age of nine, Shen enrolled at the Hunan Arts School (now Hunan Vocational College of the Arts) to study traditional Chinese opera. From 1978 to 1984, he trained in voice, movement, and stage performance. Alongside this, he developed skills in traditional Chinese painting and calligraphy. Between 1984 and 1989, he performed lead roles with the Hunan State Xian Opera Company.

During the early 1980s, following China's reengagement with the West, Shen became interested in Western classical art. He studied the works of artists such as Michelangelo, Leonardo da Vinci, Rembrandt, Paul Cézanne, Amedeo Modigliani, Francis Bacon, and Lucian Freud, focusing particularly on oil painting techniques.

In 1989, he discovered modern dance and moved to Guangzhou to study at the Guangzhou Modern Dance Academy, China's first formal institution for contemporary dance. His instructors included Ross Parks and David Hochoy of the Martha Graham Dance Company, Betty Jones and Fritz Ludin of the José Limón Dance Company, Claudia Gitelman of the Alwin Nikolais Dance Company, and Liz Walton from the Paul Taylor Dance Company. This program was supported by both the American Dance Festival and the Asian Cultural Council.

In 1991, Shen became one of the founding members of the Guangdong Modern Dance Company, the first professional modern dance ensemble in China. He worked with the company as a choreographer and performer until 1994.

=== Early works ===
In the early 1990s, Shen Wei produced over ten original dance works and created numerous oil paintings, reflecting his interdisciplinary artistic approach. Notable choreographed pieces for the Guangdong Modern Dance Company included Still Child, Racing With the Sun, Colored Relations, and Insomnia, several of which entered the company's active repertory. His experimental style positioned him among the early pioneers of avant-garde performance art in China.

In 1994, Shen premiered a solo multimedia production titled Small Room, which toured in Guangzhou, Beijing, and Hong Kong. That same year, he was awarded First Prize in both choreography and performance at the National Modern Dance Competition in China.

== Career ==
=== Early New York life and work (1995–1999) ===
In January 1995, Shen Wei moved to New York City after receiving a three-month scholarship from the Nikolais/Louis Dance Lab. Over the next five years, he engaged in artistic experimentation influenced by filmmakers and artists such as Andrei Tarkovsky, Federico Fellini, Mark Rothko, Henri Cartier-Bresson, Igor Stravinsky, and Steve Reich. He also explored release techniques in dance, which informed the early development of his signature choreographic style.

During this time, Shen performed with Murray Louis and participated in four productions by Martha Clarke. He also began choreographing for the American Dance Festival and Alvin Ailey II. In 1997, Cloud Gate Dance Theater presented a revised version of his work The Bed, originally commissioned by the American Dance Festival in 1995. He toured his solo production Small Room at venues including the Palace Theater in London, the Asia Society in New York, and Hollins University in Virginia.

== Philosophy ==
Shen Wei in 2011

Shen Wei describes himself as an artist deeply engaged with the human body as a medium of expression. In a 2011 interview with Bloomberg, he stated that "dancers should show expression through their body movement. They're not actors."

He developed a choreographic method called "Natural Body Development," which integrates breath, proprioception, visual focus, weight, and gravity into the movement process. Shen emphasizes that movement can originate from breath or internal energy (chi), and that external and internal energies continuously interact through the body. He challenges dualistic philosophies, advocating that dancers develop both their physical and mental capacities. "I don't use dancers to copy movement," he said. "Human beings are not just puppets. A dancer has to have a really open mind and be willing to take a risk."

Shen's creative process often includes structured improvisation, encouraging performers to explore intuitive responses within choreographic frameworks. His 2003 work Rite of Spring incorporates guided improvisations that result in a balance between choreographic structure and spontaneous movement.

In discussing his artistic motivation, Shen has stated that his primary goal is to inspire others. He has emphasized the importance of innovation, clarity, and emotional connection, remarking: "When you're an artist... you want to make things that have never existed before... you want people to feel these things are new, make them communicate, become part of the culture, and to inspire other human beings."

== Select works ==
Folding (2000)

- World Premiere: Guangdong Modern Dance Company
- Concept, Choreography, Costumes, Set and Make-up Design: Shen Wei
- Music: John Tavener and Tibetan Buddhist Chant
- Lighting: David Ferri

Near the Terrace-Part I (2001)

- World Premiere: American Dance Festival
- Concept, Choreography, Set and Costume Design: Shen Wei
- Music: Arvo Pärt
- Lighting: David Ferri

Behind Resonance (2001)

- World Premiere: SUNY Purchase
- Choreography, Set and Costume Design: Shen Wei
- Music: David Lang
- Lighting: David Ferri and Shen Wei

Near the Terrace-Part II (2002)

- World Premiere: American Dance Festival
- Concept, Choreography, Set and Costume Design: Shen Wei
- Music: Arvo Pärt, Benjamin Iobst, music of Mangkunêgaran
- Lighting: David Ferri

Rite of Spring (2003)

- Concept, Choreography, Costumes, Set and Make-up Design: Shen Wei
- Score: Igor Stravinsky
- Musical Recording: Fazıl Say
- Lighting: David Ferri

Exhibition-Solo Painting Exhibition (2003)

- A series of Paintings created in conjunction with his abstracted Rite of Spring was first exhibited as part of the company's New York City debut at the Lincoln Center Festival in 2003

Connect Transfer (2004)

- World Premiere: American Dance Festival
- Concept, Choreography, Set, and Costume Design: Shen Wei
- Music: György Ligeti, Kevin Volans, Iannis Xenakis
- Lighting: Jennifer Tipton

Map (2005)

- World Premiere: Lincoln Center Festival
- Concept, Choreography, Costumes, Set Design: Shen Wei
- Music: Steve Reich
- Lighting: David Scott Bolman

The Second Visit To the Empress (2005, 2007)

- World Premiere: American Dance Festival 2005
- Direction, Choreography, Set, Make-up and Costume Design: Shen Wei
- Music: Traditional Chinese Beijing Opera
- Lighting: Jennifer Tipton

Exhibition-Solo Painting Exhibition – Movements (2005)

- Hong Kong New Vision Arts Festival with Chambers Fine Arts in New York 2005

Re-Part I (2006)

- Concept, Choreography, Set and Costume Design: Shen Wei
- Music: Traditional Tibetan Chant
- Vocals: Ani Choying Dolma
- Lighting: Jennifer Tipton

Re-Part II (2007)

- Concept, Choreography, Set and Costume Design; and Sounds and Images recorded at Angkor Wat: Shen Wei
- Music: John Tavener's "Tears of the Angels," with Traditional Cambodian Music, and Original recordings by Shen Wei
- Lighting: Jennifer Tipton
- Projection Design: Shen Wei & Daniel Hartnett

Exhibition-Solo Painting Exhibition – Movements (2007)

- Chambers Fine Arts in New York 2007

Fashion Show at Paris Haute Couture-WUYONG, by the Chinese designer Ma Ke (2007)

- Direction, Choreography and Co-installation design for 40 performing artists at the Palais Royale in Paris: Shen Wei

The Beijing Olympic Opening Ceremony "Scroll" Segment 2008

- Direction and Choreography: Shen Wei
- Original Score: Chen Qi-Gung
- General Director of the Opening Ceremony: Zhang Yimou

Re-Part III (2009)

- Concept, Choreography, Set and Costume Design; and Sounds and Images recorded on China's Silk Road: Shen Wei
- Original Score: David Lang
- Recorded Violinist: Todd Reynolds
- Lighting: Jennifer Tipton
- Projection Design: Shen Wei and Daniel Hartnett

7 to 8 and (2010)

- World Premiere: Les Ballets de Monte-Carlo
- Choreography and visual and projection design: Shen Wei
- Original Score: Dirk Haubrich

NYC Guerilla-Site Specific Work (2010)

- Sites: Times Square, Wall Street, Union Square, 42nd Street, outside of New York Public Library Main Branch, outside of The Metropolitan Museum of Art, Columbia University, and Battery Park
- Concept and Choreography: Shen Wei
- Performed by: Shen Wei Dance Arts

Still Moving (2011)

- World Premiere: Metropolitan Museum of Art
- Concept, Choreography, and Visual Design: Shen Wei
- Original Score: Daniel Burke
- Costume: Shen Wei and Austin Scarlett

Limited States (2011)

- World Premiere: American Dance Festival
- Concept, Choreography, Video and Animation Design: Shen Wei
- Original Score: Daniel Burke
- Lighting: Shen Wei and Matthew F. Lewandowski II
- Costume: Shen Wei and Austin Scarlett

Undivided Divided (2011)

- World-premiere: Park Avenue Armory
- Concept, Choreography and Visual Design: Shen Wei
- Original Score: Sō Percussion
- Lighting: Jennifer Tipton
- Video and Animation: Josh Horowitz, Layne Braunstein and Blair Neal
- Costume: Austin Scarlett
- Sound Design: Lawson White

Exhibition-Solo Exhibition and Installation Performance (2012)

- Mana Contemporary in New Jersey, USA. March 11 – June 11, 2012

The New You (2012)

- World Premiere: The Meadows School of the Arts at Southern Methodist University, Dallas, TX
- Concept, Direction, Choreography and Visual Design: Shen Wei

Carmina Burana (2013)

- World Premiere: Teatro San Carlo, Napoli, Italy
- Concept, Choreography, and Direction: Shen Wei
- Program Carl Orff: Carmina Burana / Anonymous, Four Cantiones profanae (orchestrated by Jordi Bernácer)
- Director of Music: Jordi Bernácer
- Chorus Master: Salvatore Caputo
- Director of Ballet: Alessandra Panzavolta
- Director of Children's Choir: Stefania Rinaldi
- Sets and costumes: Shen Wei
- Angela Nisi, soprano; Valdis Jansons, baritone; Ilham Nazarov, countertenor
- Soloists from Shen Wei Dance Arts: Cecily Campbell, Cynthia Koppe, Evan Copeland, Alex Dean Speedie
- Orchestra, Choir, Ballet and Children's Choir of the Teatro di San Carlo

Sacre Du Printemps (2013)

- World Premiere: The Amsterdam Music Theatre
- Commissioned and Performed by: Dutch National Ballet
- Choreography, Set, and Costumes: Shen Wei
- Music: Igor Stravinsky, Le Sacre du Printemps
- Accompaniment: Holland Symfonia conducted by Matthew Rowe

Exhibition-Solo Painting Exhibition – "Shen Wei: In Black, White and Gray (2014)

- Miami Dade College Museum of Art + Design in Miami, Florida. December 5, 2014 – February 1, 2015
- 11 paintings, oil and acrylic on canvas

Untitled No. 12 – 1 (2014, 2016)

- Concept, Choreography, Costumes: Shen Wei
- Sound Design: Metronome Collage by Shen Wei, played live by dancers
- Performed alongside painting exhibition, Shen Wei: In Black, White and Gray, at Miami Dade College Museum of Art + Design 2014
- Performed alongside painting exhibition, Shen Wei: Dance Strokes, at Asia Society Hong Kong Centre 2016

Untitled No 12 – 2 (2015)

- Concept, Choreography, Direction, Set and Costumes: Shen Wei
- Music: Echoes from the Gorge, Chou Wen-chung
- Sound Design: Metronome Collage by Shen Wei, played live by dancers
- Lighting Design: Christina Watanabe-Jensen
- Projection Images: Selections from Black, White, and Gray painting series by Shen Wei
- Projection Realization: Rocco DiSanti
- Commission: Spoleto Festival USA, American Dance Festival, Brooklyn Academy of Music

Exhibition-Solo Painting Exhibition – "Shen Wei In Black, White and Gray (2015)

- The Tucson Museum of Art, Tucson, Arizona. October 9 – December 6, 2015
- 5 paintings, oil and acrylic on canvas
- Hosted simultaneously with Shen Wei Dance Arts performance

Exhibition-Group Painting Exhibition – "Performance and Remnant (2015)

- The Fine Art Society, London, UK. October 9 – 31, 2015
- 3 paintings, oil and acrylic on canvas
- Other artists included: Justin Davis Anderson, Jo Broughton, Ori Gersht, John Giorno, Andy Goldsworthy, Rashaad Newsome, Michael Petry, and Geraldine Swayne

Exhibition-Solo Painting Exhibition – "Shen Wei: Dance Strokes (2016)

- Asia Society Hong Kong Centre, Hong Kong. March 20 – April 4, 2016
- 7 paintings, oil and acrylic on canvas
- In conjunction with Shen Wei Dance Arts' Untitled No. 12 – 1 and Untitled No. 32 (Bodies and Rooftop)

Untitled No. 32 (Bodies and Rooftop) (2016)

- Asia Society Hong Kong Centre, Joseph Lau and Josephine Lau Roof Garden
- Site-specific
- Concept and Choreography: Shen Wei
- Performed by: Shen Wei Dance Arts
- Set and Production: Andy Y.O. Tsui
- Music: Echoes From The Gorge by Chou Wen-Chung

Neither (2016)

- Brooklyn Academy of Music
- Choreography: Shen Wei
- Performed by: Shen Wei Dance Arts
- Music: Morton Feldman, Samuel Beckett

Everything is Connected (2018)

- Film
- Nowness
- Concept: Shen Wei

Integrate (2021 & 2023)

- West Bund Dome, Shanghai, China
- Site Specific
- Exhibition, Film, Dance (live performance)

Summery(2022)

- R. J. REYNOLDS INDUSTRIES THEATER
- American Dance Festival Footprints Commission
- Choreography: Shen Wei
- Performed by: Footprints Students
- Music: Arvo Part

Dong Po: Life in Poems (2022)

- Chorography: Shen Wei
- Performed by: China Oriental Performing Arts Group Co., Ltd. & Meishan Song and Dance Theatre

== Awards and distinctions ==
- Samuel H. Scripps/American Dance Festival Award for Lifetime Achievement in Choreography (2022)
- International Society for The Performing Arts's Distinguished Artist Award (2022)
- New York City Center Artist-in-Residence Fellow (2012)
- Artist to Artist Award for Exceptional Merit in Contribution to the Arts (2011)
- Park Avenue Armory Artist-in-Residence Fellow (2011)
- Algur H. Meadows Prize (2010)
- Asian American Arts Alliance Award (2010)
- Young Global Leader Honoree, World Economic Forum (2009)
- MacArthur Foundation Fellow (2007)
- US Artist Fellow (2007)
- The John F. Kennedy Performing arts Center Five Years Artist in Residency (2007–2013)
- Les Etoiles de Ballet at the Palais des Festival (2006)
- Helpmann Awards for Performing Arts in Australia: Best Ballet or Dance Work (2005)
- Nijinsky Award for Emerging Choreographer (2004)
- Guggenheim Fellow (2001)
- New York Foundation for the Arts Fellowship (2000)
- Asian Cultural Council Fellowship (1995)
- First Prize at the National Modern Dance Competition, China (1994)

== See also ==
- Chinese Americans in New York City
- LGBT culture in New York City
- List of self-identified LGBTQ New Yorkers
