= Willy Tsao =

Chinese modern dance choreographer

Willy Tsao is a Chinese modern dance choreographer. He runs three major modern dance companies in China. He is the Founder and Artistic Director of City Contemporary Dance Company (Hong Kong) and BeijingDance/LDTX, as well as the Managing Director of Guangdong Modern Dance Company.
