= Weston Teruya =

Artist and arts administrator (b. 1977)

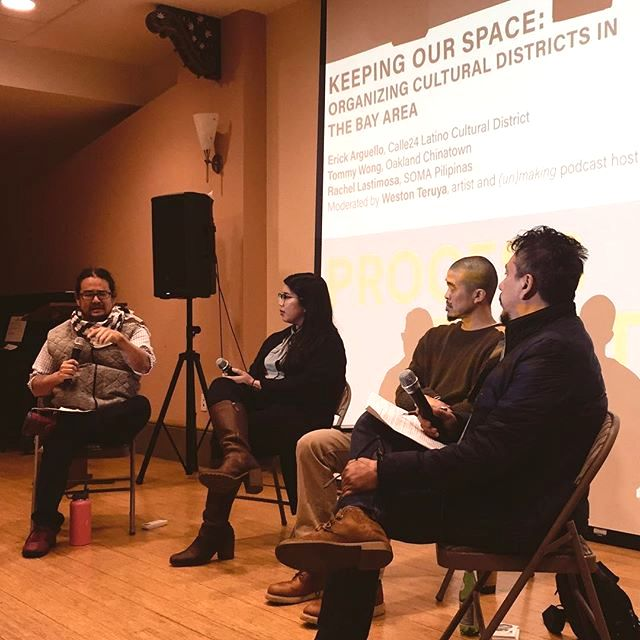
- Left to right: Weston Teruya, Rachel Lastimosa, Tommy Wong, Erick Arguello; panel discussion Keeping Our Space: Organizing Cultural Districts in the Bay Area
- Born: 1977 (age 48–49); Honolulu, Hawaii
- Education: BA Pomona College; MFA California College of the Arts
- Known for: Sculpture, Drawing, Installation
- Movement: Social practice art
- Website: http://westonteruya.com

Weston Teruya (born 1977 in Honolulu, Hawaii) is an Oakland-based visual artist and arts administrator. Teruya's paper sculptures, installations, and drawings reconfigure symbols forming unexpected meanings that tamper with social/political realities, speculating on issues of power, control, visibility, protection and, by contrast, privilege. With Michele Carlson and Nathan Watson, he is a member of the Related Tactics artists' collective and often exhibits under that name.

== Biography ==
Weston Teruya was born in Honolulu, Hawai'i, in 1977. He studied at Pomona College and received his BA in Studio Art, with a minor in Asian American studies in 1999. He studied a dual master's degree at California College of the Arts and graduated in 2007 with an MFA in Painting and Drawing and MA in Visual and Critical Studies.

He was a Commissioner for the Berkeley Civic Arts Commission, Berkeley, California between 2013 and 2016. In 2014, Teruya was selected by the Berkeley Art Center to be the sole juror for the exhibition 'Feature'. Teruya curated shows for the Berkeley Art Center, Southern Exposure (art space), and the Kearny Street Workshop in San Francisco.

In 2016, Teruya was an artist-in-residence at Recology, a residency program which provides artists with access to the San Francisco Solid Waste Transfer and Recycling Center. In response to this environment, he created Lessons Learned a sculptural installation made from recycled paper, office supplies, construction debris and other material from the city dump as part of his body of work, The Space Behind.

== Work ==
Teruya's work touches upon issues of power and politics, often in relation to the San Francisco Bay Area. His work in 2010, The Gracious City at Its Neighbor’s Edge, explores the geographical and social juxtaposition of a golf course and Los Padrinos Juvenile Hall. His art also draws upon his own background, such as in his works related to the Hawaiian diaspora. His research involves the exploration of community histories in relation to the intersection of social movements and public space. Teruya's art has been presented by the San Francisco Arts Commission as part of the Market Street Poster Series, responding to the social dynamics related to sanctuary cities.

== Exhibitions ==
Weston Teruya has exhibited widely. In 2019, he had a solo exhibition, expansion (land.water.sky), at the Commons Gallery, University of Hawaiʻi at Mānoa, Honolulu, HI. In 2018 he and Related Tactics exhibited Added Value, a public art project in collaboration with Stephanie Syjuco and San Francisco Museum of Modern Art. In 2017-18 Teruya created Means of Exchange (South of Market), a public project with Kearny Street Workshop & Kimberley Acebo Arteche, in San Francisco, CA. In 2017 he was in a three-person show, The future needs new plans, at the Patricia Sweetow Gallery, in Oakland, CA. In 2016 he exhibited the installation the space left behind, as his Recology Artist-in-Residence show, in San Francisco, CA. In 2016 he exhibited NextNewPaper, in a group exhibition at the San Jose Institute of Contemporary Art, San Jose, CA. In 2016 his work was shown in Work in Progress: Investigations South of Market, at the Yerba Buena Center for the Arts, San Francisco, CA. In 2015 his work was included in a three-person show, Art + Process + Ideas, at the Mills College Art Museum, Oakland, CA In 2011 he had a solo exhibition, 2x2 Solos: Weston Teruya, at Pro Arts Gallery, in Oakland, CA. In 2009 he had a solo show, The Pull of Two Signs Rising Over the Land, at the Patricia Sweetow Gallery, San Francisco, CA.

== Honors and awards ==
In 2018 Teruya received an Asian Cultural Council Individual Fellowship to participate in a three-month residency in Ho Chi Minh City, Vietnam in 2019. Teruya received a fellowship in 2017 from the Kala Institute to create a sculptural installation addressing cross-racial solidarity movements that link communities of color. He was a 2017 Artist-in-Residence at the de Young Museum in San Francisco where he created the city breathing, a paper installation. In 2016 Teurya and collaborator Kimberley Acebo Arteche were awarded a CreativeWorkFund grant to produce AllTogether Now at the San Francisco State University Fine Arts Gallery. Teruya received the Artadia Award in 2009.

== Critical reception and reviews ==
- Machida, Margo, Pacific Itineraries: Islands and Oceanic Imaginaries in Contemporary Asian American Art, in Asian Diasporic Visual Cultures and the Americas.
- Santhi Kavuri-Bauer, Perspectives - The Art of Hydrarchy: Asian American Art as Maritime Critique and Utopian Gesture, in Asian Diasporic Visual Cultures and the Americas.

== Related Tactics collective ==
Teruya is a founding member of the artist collective Related Tactics, which participated in the Added Value collection at the San Francisco Museum of Modern Art. The collective is made up of artists, curators, educators, and writers of color who develop opportunities and create intersectional projects addressing issues of race and culture.

== Collections ==
Teruya's work is included in:

- the Alameda County Art Collection
- the City of Lafayette Public Art Collection
- the Center for the Study of Political Graphics
- the Mills College Art Museum
- the San Francisco Civic Art Collection
- the University of Richmond – Boatwright Memorial Library, Richmond, VA (with Related Tactics)
