= John M. Rosenfield =

American art historian

John Max Rosenfield (October 9, 1924 – December 16, 2013) was an American art historian, with a specialization in Japanese art.

He began teaching at Harvard University in 1968, and was later the Abby Aldrich Rockefeller Professor of East Asian Art, Emeritus and Curator of Oriental Art at Harvard's Fogg Art Museum.

In March, 2001, he was awarded the 19th Yamagata Banto prize for his contributions in spreading Japanese culture outside Japan.

He graduated from University of California, Berkeley, Southern Methodist University, University of Iowa, and Harvard University.

== Literary works ==
- Rosenfield, John M. Dynastic arts of the Kushans. 1967. (1993 ISBN 81-215-0579-8)
- Rosenfield, John M. Japanese Arts of the Heian Period, 794-1185. Asian Society, 1967.
- Rosenfield, John M. and Shujiro Shimada. Traditions of Japanese Art : Selections from the Kimiko and John Powers Collection. Harvard University Press, 1970. (ISBN 0-674-90125-8)
- Rosenfield, John M. The courtly tradition in Japanese art and literature: selections from Hofer and Hyde collections. Fogg Art Museum, Harvard University, 1973.
- Rosenfield, John M. and Elizabeth Ten Grotenhuis. Journey of the Three Jewels: Japanese Buddhist Paintings from Western Collections. Tuttle Publishing, 1979. (ISBN 0-87848-054-4)
- Rosenfield, John M. et al. eds. Extraordinary Persons : Works by Eccentric, Non-Conformist Japanese Artists of the Early Modern Era (1580-1868) in the collection of Kimiko & John Powers. 3 vols. Harvard University Press, 1998. (ISBN 1-891771-00-0)
- Rosenfield, John M. and Buson Yosa. Mynah Birds and Flying Rocks: Word and Image in the Art of Yosa Buson (Franklin D. Murphy Lectures, XVIII). Spencer Museum of Art, University of Kansas, 2004. (ISBN 0-913689-48-3)
- Rosenfield, John M. Portraits of Chōgen: The Transformation of Buddhist Art in Early Medieval Japan. Leiden, the Netherlands: Brill, 2011.
- Rosenfield, John M. Preserving the Dharma: Hōzan Tankai and Japanese Buddhist Art of the Early Modern Era. Princeton University Press, 2016. (ISBN 9780691163970)
