= Guangdong Modern Dance Company =

Professional modern dance company in China

Guangdong Modern Dance Company (GMDC) is the first professional modern dance company in China founded in 1992 by its director Willy Tsao. The company's former dancers and choreographers include Shen Wei, Xing Liang, Sang Jijia, Yang Yun-tao.

GMDC runs Guangdong Modern Dance Week every year which is one of the major dace festivals in mainland China and Asia
