= Mella Jaarsma =

Dutch-Indonesian painter

Mella Jaarsma (born Emmeloord, 1960) is an artist originally from the Netherlands but now residing in Indonesia.

== Early life and career ==
She spent her childhood in the Netherlands, where she also studied at the Minerva Academy of Visual Arts in Groningen.

Jaarsma's work comments on social and political issues within Indonesian society, mainly: discrimination, racialism, minorities and identity. Her most well known work are body-covering shelters made out of unexpected materials. For example, frog skins, squirrels, bats, snakes and chickens are employed to create a wearable piece. The garment symbolises protection, and visually represents fear or a need for a 'security blanket'. Her work also alludes to the isolation of human beings and the need for a filtered approach to the world.

Jaarsma has achieved international recognition, having been presented in international art events and galleries including: Singapore Art Museum, Third Asia Pacific Triennal, Queensland Art Gallery, Limerick City Gallery of Art, Gwangju Biennale, Yokohama Triennale, Katonah Museum of Art, National Gallery of Indonesia and The Royal Academy of Arts.

In 1988, with her partner Nindityo Adipurnomo, she founded the Cemeti Art House in Yogyakarta. Cemeti Art House organises exhibitions, projects and residencies.

Mella Jaarsma's work I Eat You Eat Me is a performance art piece that well represents the social interactions between people. The work began in 2001 and was further developed in 2012 at the Smart Museum in Chicago in the form of a dinner for six people. In this 2001 series, Mella Jaarsma paired participants in pairs to wear bibs of her design. The bibs are made of two pieces of leather fabric that act as lanyards linking the aluminum plates in the middle to form a dining table. The participants put on the bibs face to face and were asked to choose and serve each other food, also taking into account the balance of the aluminum table. Between the wavering food choices and the suspended table, people need to find the balance and make their own decisions, much like a mode of interaction between people in society. Mella Jaarsma said about the meaning of this work: " Interaction is my point, and I like this situation when you don’t know if it’s art or not. For example, in my project I Eat You Eat Me the idea was that the people coming to the performance had to feed other people in a mutual relationship. I presented the performance in restaurants rather than in a gallery, because the idea is that it doesn’t matter if it is art or not. What matters was that you were there and you could have this experience".

"Hi Inlander" is an installation of four cloak-like stitches of animal skin created by Mella Jaarsma in 1999. The name "Hi Inlander" is a derogatory greeting to the indigenous people of Indonesia during the Dutch colonization, alluding to their colonial status. The collection uses frog leg skin, chicken claws, kangaroo skin and fish skin as her "second skin", which can be worn to cover the body from head to shins. The materials used are partly food. In her use of materials, Jaarsma wants to express the uncertainty of identity and to make us understand the difficulty of accommodating difference. She expresses this by including the skin of many different species of animals and making different emotional connections to them for people from different regions, for example people with Australian experience may have more emotional resonance with kangaroo skin while chicken feet may be a more familiar food for East Asians. In addition the shape of the cloak is similar to the Muslim jilab, which can be further interpreted as a set of works created for women's freedom and social conflict. By adding these subtle cultural codes, she succeeds in blurring contextual boundaries and allowing for the fusion of cultures between multiple locations.
