= Ma Ke (fashion designer) =

Chinese fashion designer (born 1971)

- Born: 1971 (age 54–55); Changchun, Jilin province, China
- Education: Suzhou Institute of Silk Textile Technology
- Occupation: Fashion designer
- Labels: EXCEPTION de Mixmind, WUYONG
- Awards: 2008 Prince Claus Award; 2007 Best Asian Fashion Designer, ELLE Style Awards (Hong Kong); 2006 Best International Chinese Fashion Designer, Modern Media Weekly Awards; 2005 Best Original Creator, China Fashion Designer Awards (Beijing); 2005 Best Fashion Designer of the New Generation, Shanghai International Fashion Culture Festival
- Website: http://mixmind.com

Ma Ke (simplified Chinese: 马可; traditional Chinese: 馬可; pinyin: Mǎ Kě) (born 1971 in Changchun, China) is a Chinese fashion designer. She has two clothing labels: EXCEPTION de Mixmind, a ready-to-wear line started in 1996 and retailed in China; and WUYONG, an haute couture line founded in 2006. In 2007, Ma Ke starred in the award-winning documentary Useless by Chinese director Jia Zhangke. In 2008, her fashion house WUYONG was appointed as a Guest member of the Chambre Syndicale de la Haute Couture in France.

Ma Ke designs have been worn by the Chinese First Lady Peng Liyuan, on several occasions.

Ma Ke is the founder of Mixmind Art & Design Co, Ltd., based in Guangzhou, China. She currently works in her studio in Zhuhai on the southern coast of Guangdong province.

== Career ==
Ma Ke graduated from the Suzhou Institute of Silk Textile Technology in 1992, and studied womenswear at Central Saint Martins. In 1996, she established her first clothing label, EXCEPTION de Mixmind. EXCEPTION is currently sold in the label's own shops in China, with major retail presence in Shanghai, Beijing and Guangzhou. Their collections comprise women's clothing made from locally sourced cotton, silk, linen and wool; plus other accessories and items.

In 2001, Ma Ke designed costumes for the concert Singing in Heaven, by the singer Dadawa. In 2005, she presented her clothing at the Shenzhen Biennale of Urbanism and Architecture, and in 2009 her work was on display at the National Art Museum of China.

Ma Ke is among the youngest of the first generation of Chinese fashion designers who have received international acclaim, and she is the first Chinese to show at Paris Haute Couture. Ma Ke is best known abroad for her two WUYONG collections: WUYONG/the Earth, which debuted at Paris Fashion Week Spring Summer 2007; and WUYONG/Qing Pin, which was held on July 3, 2008, as her first show for Paris Haute Couture.

Ma Ke's designs are celebrated for their use of environmentally friendly fabrics and recycled materials, and for their manufacture using traditional dyeing, weaving and embroidery techniques, most notably those of the Dong people of Southern China. Her fashion house EXCEPTION de Mixmind hosts shows in China each season for their new collections. Ma Ke's first two shows for WUYONG, held more than a year apart, were distinctive for their absence of a runway and for incorporating certain elements of performance art. Her unorthodox shows and anti-consumerist statements have earned Ma Ke a reputation for being anti-fashion, but she is equally lauded for her conscientious efforts to preserve traditions and protect the environment.

== WUYONG ==
In 2006, Ma Ke founded a new fashion label, WUYONG (simplified Chinese: 无用; traditional Chinese: 無用; pinyin: wúyòng), which literally means Useless. Ma Ke's workshop in Zhuhai, which produces the WUYONG collections, employs a team of workers skilled in traditional clothing manufacturing techniques. All stages of production are done in-house, including the spinning, weaving, dyeing and sewing; even using traditional equipment such as a Chinese loom dating from the 19th century. Some of the articles in the collections either incorporate or are fashioned out of recycled material and found objects, including a paint-covered sheet made into a dress and an old tarpaulin constructed into an over-sized coat.

=== Paris Fashion Week ===
In 2007, Ma Ke was invited to present her first collection, titled WUYONG/the Earth, at Paris Fashion Week. The show was held in the gymnasium of the Lycée Stanislas on February 25, 2007. Rather than presenting the collection on a catwalk as in a traditional fashion show, Ma Ke had the models stand motionless on tall, illuminated plinths, which were arranged on the gymnasium floor. The audience was invited to walk amongst the models and examine the clothing up-close. The show was a triumph: Elle magazine called Ma Ke's Paris debut "brilliant... one of the great moments of the season."

The collection was later put on display at the gallery Joyce Palais-Royal from March 1 to April 6, 2007.

WUYONG was the subject of a film about the Chinese garment industry by the award-winning director Jia Zhangke. The documentary, also titled Useless, features interviews with Ma Ke as well as her show at Paris Fashion Week. The film went on to win the Orizzonti Doc Prize at the 64th Venice Film Festival in 2007.

Ma Ke is not the first Chinese fashion designer to show at Paris Fashion Week. That distinction belongs to the designer Frankie Xie and his label JEFEN, which had its Paris debut in 2006.

=== Fashion in Motion ===
In 2008, Ma Ke was invited to reprise WUYONG/the Earth as part of the Fashion in Motion live catwalk events held at the Victoria & Albert Museum in London. Three performances were given in the Raphael Gallery on May 16, 2008. Concurrently, a piece from the collection was on display in the museum's China Design Now exhibition, where Ma Ke was featured along with two other Chinese fashion designers, Zhang Da and Wang Yiyang.

=== Paris Haute Couture ===
In May 2008, WUYONG was appointed as a Guest member of the Chambre Syndicale de la Haute Couture. Her collection, titled WUYONG/Qing pin, was shown in the Jardin du Palais-Royal in Paris on July 3, 2008. There were a number of elements of the performance that made Ma Ke's haute couture debut rather exceptional. The collection was shown outside and in public (most couture shows are strictly invitation only). For models Ma Ke selected a diverse group of modern dancers, martial artists and tai chi practitioners, and in lieu of walking down a runway had them perform a choreographed piece by the renowned Chinese dancer Shen Wei. Ma Ke invited a Mongolian singer to perform a capella for the show, and brought two seamstresses from her Zhu Hai studio to work a traditional spinning wheel and loom during the performance.

Ma Ke's haute couture debut made the front page of Le Monde. The President of the Fédération française de la couture remarked of the show, "We are witness to the birth of a true talent."

== Publications ==
- Ma Ke. (2006) Point One. Map Book Publishers. ISBN 978-988-98395-6-7.
