= City Contemporary Dance Company =

Dance company in Hong Kong, China

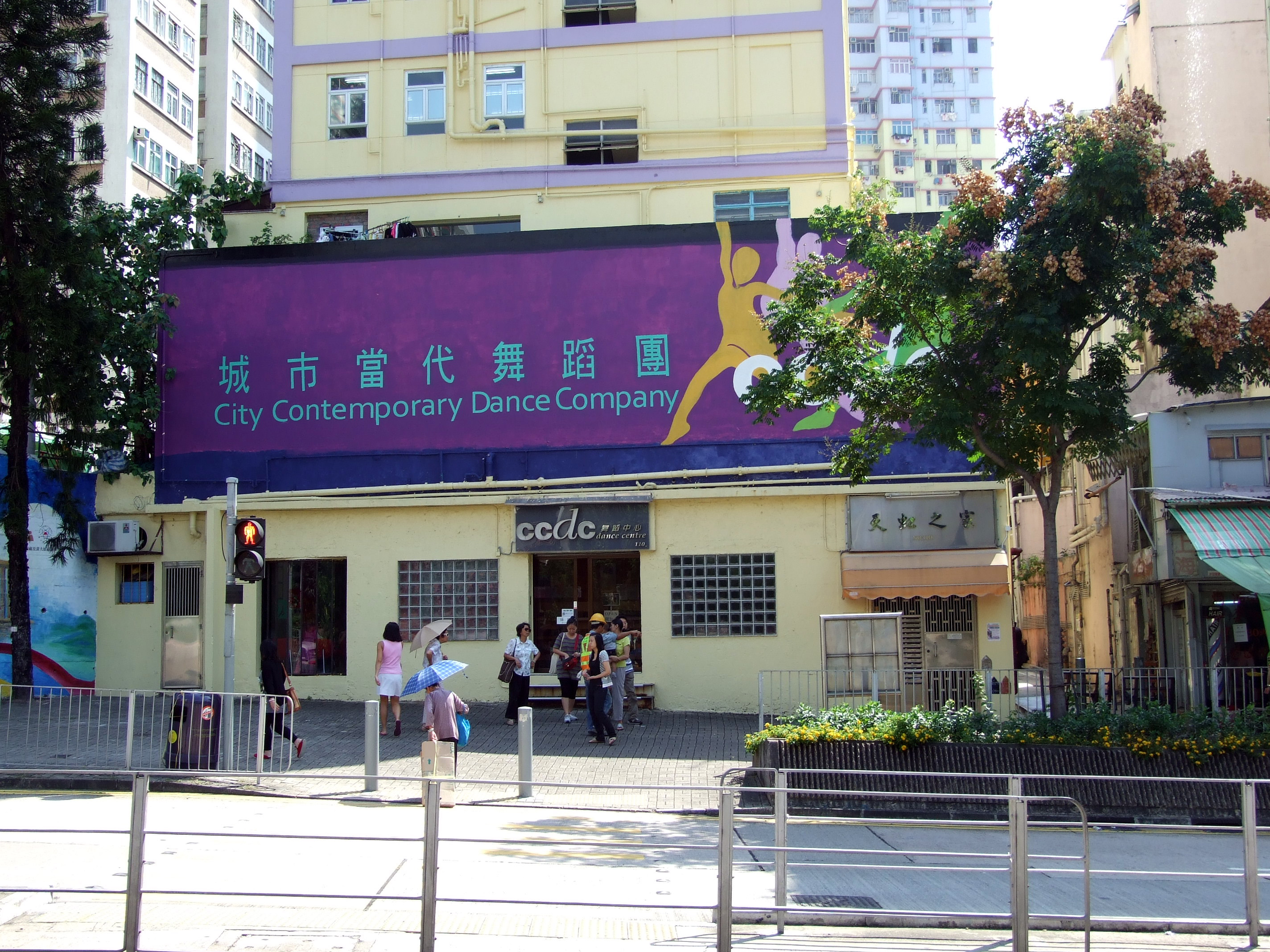
CCDC

City Contemporary Dance Company (CCDC; traditional Chinese: 城市當代舞蹈團; simplified Chinese: 城市当代舞蹈团) is a modern dance company in Hong Kong. Dr Willy Tsao founded the company in 1979, and he was the Artistic Director from 1989 to 2019. In May 2020, Yuri Ng was appointed as the 4th Artistic Director, succeeding Tsao. The company is supported by the Government of Hong Kong Special Administrative Region.

CCDC has presented more than 200 original works, including productions by Tsao and other leading choreographers, such as Helen Lai, Mui Cheuk-yin, Pun Siu-fai and Yuri Ng. It has also presented collaborations with artists from other media and with artists from around the world.

CCDC has an annual audience of 100,000 and has made 66 international tours to over 30 cities including New York City, Montreal, London, Paris, Berlin, Lyon, Sydney, Tokyo, Seoul, Singapore, Manila, Beijing, Shanghai, Taipei, Munich, Stuttgart, Mumbai, Delhi, Brisbane, Copenhagen, Prague, Karmiel (Israel), St. Petersburg, Moscow, Los Angeles, and Washington, D.C.

According to The Oxford Dictionary of Dance, the CCDC "has since become that region's major promoter of modern dance, featuring an extensive repertory of works, the majority created by Chinese choreographers including Tsao himself".
