= Ilham Nazarov =

Azerbaijani opera singer (born 1985)

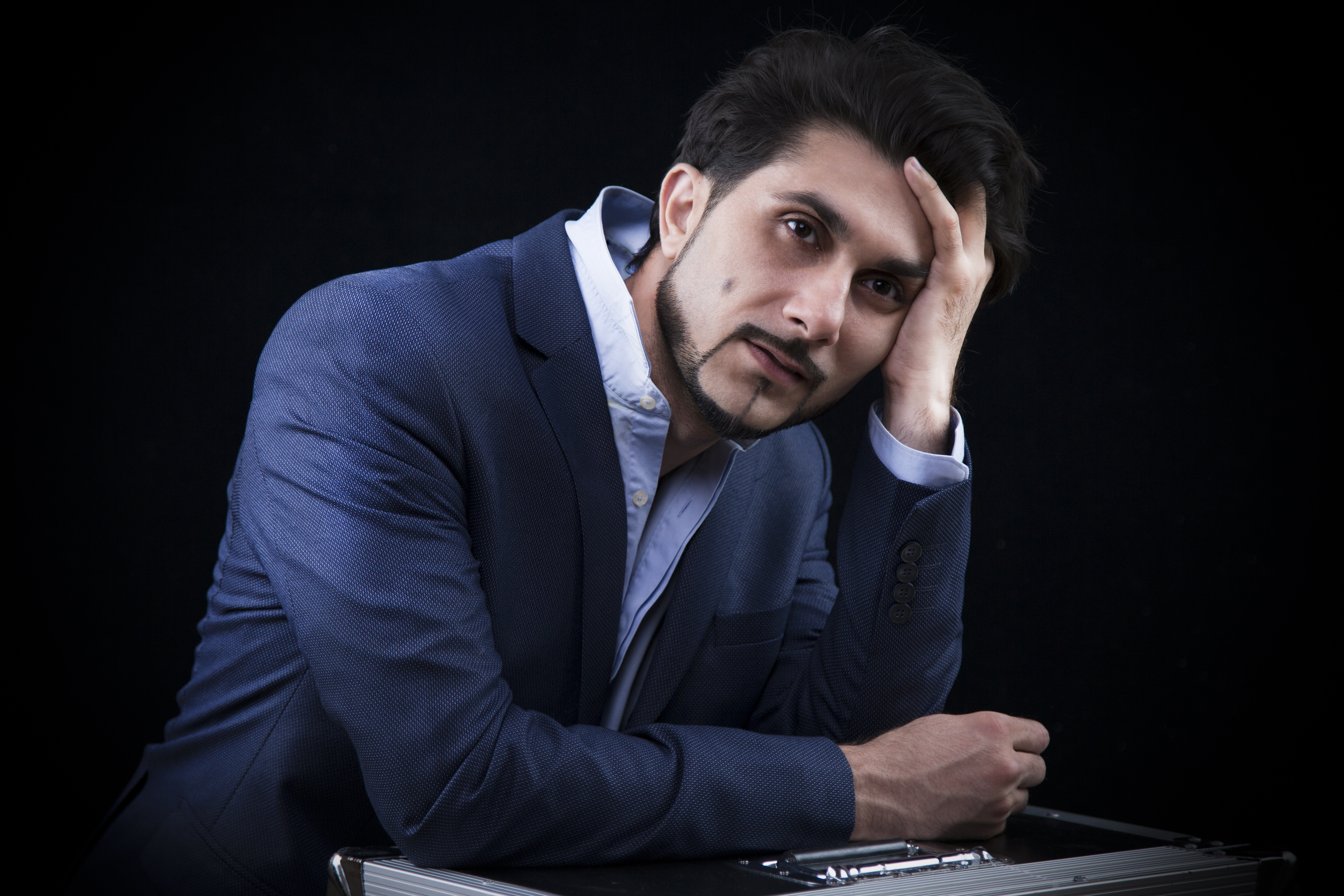
- Azerbaijani: İlham İslam oğlu Nəzərov

Background information
- Born: Ilham Islam oglu Nazarov; October 5, 1985 (age 40); Shirvan, Azerbaijan SSR
- Genres: Opera
- Occupations: Opera singer, music teacher, voice teacher – Countertenor & Bass-baritone
- Years active: 2000–present

Ilham Islam oglu Nazarov (Azerbaijani: İlham İslam oğlu Nəzərov), born October 5, 1985, in Shirvan, Azerbaijan SSR, is an opera singer. Soloist of the M.Magomayev Azerbaijan State Academic Philharmonic. Senior lecturer at the Baku Music Academy.

== Life and musical career ==
Ilham Nazarov was born on October 5, 1985, in Shirvan city. He showed interest in music from an early age. I Nazarov began his musical education in People's Artist Agakhan Abdullayev's class as a khanende, but later took up academic vocal. In 2003, he graduated from the Bulbul Specialized Secondary Music School and went to the U.Hajibeyli Baku Academy of Music, the faculty of solo singing and opera training.

I.Nazarov has been engaged in professional stage activities for 20 years (since 2000). His first role on the stage of UNS Creative Stage as an opera singer was in the musical performance "Bakı" by Tofig Guliyev. During these years, the vocalist became the participant in many musical festivals and international competitions, as well as performed solo concert programs. After the successful premiere of the opera "Intizar" by Firengiz Ali-Zade, the vocalist was invited as a soloist to the Azerbaijan State Academic Opera and Ballet Theatre where later, I.Nazarov created images, such as Aleko, Betto di Signa, Silvio, Papageno, Prilepa, Cherubino and many other.

In 2010, the singer pursued the master's degree with honours at Baku Academy of Music, and as a baritone, he went to one of the famous Italian music academies – Accademia D'Arte Lyrica Osimo.F. At the academy, he studied in the world famous Vincenzo de Vivo's class. Since 2011, I. Nazarov has gone down in the history of Azerbaijani musical culture as the first countertenor. I. Nazarov's debut as a countertenor was in Italy in A. Scarlatti's oratorio "Passione Secondo Giovanni’ (Testo, Pilatus). In those years, Ilham Nazarov took master classes from the world famous vocal masters F.Fazioli and P.Jaroussky.

In 2014, the singer performed the role of Cherubino from Mozart's opera "The Marriage of Figaro" on the stage of the Azerbaijan State Academic Opera and Ballet Theatre. In 2016, on the stage of the Azerbaijan State Academic Opera and Ballet Theatre, for the first time in the history of the world of vocal art, the singer performed Prilepa of Tchaikovsky's opera "The Queen of Spades" or "Pique Dame" as a countertenor. I. Nazarov is a popularizer of baroque music in the Azerbaijani musical culture.

Nazarov is the winner of the International Baroque Music Competition (I place), the Best Countertenor of the World (II place), IV Muslim Magomaev International Vocalists Contest (I place), the Big Opera TV Competition (finalist), International Vocal Coach Competition (I place), Voice of Astana (III place), Internazionale Musicale "Citta di Pesaro" (I place), the Jovdat Hajiyev International Musical Competition (Grand Prix), Best F. Schubert Interpreter (I place), and many others.

In 2019, he performed the vocal cycle "Schwanengesang" D.957 by F.Schubert as a countertenor, and on August 6, 2020, this performance was released on CD. In 2020, Gulnaz Abdullazade, the vice-rector for scientific work in the U.Hajibeyli Baku Academy of Music, Doctor of Philosophy, Honoured Art Worker wrote and published the book "Ilham Nazarov: A Voice Without Borders...” about the artist's life and creative activity.

He is married, and has three children.

== Pedagogical activity ==
Nazarov started his pedagogical activity in 2008 and educated dozens of laureates of republican and international competitions. The artist is invited as a juror to a number of international competitions and contests. The list of these international competitions and contests includes: the Competition held at the Azerbaijan State Song Theatre named after Rashid Behbudov with the support of the Ministry of Culture and Tourism of the Republic of Azerbaijan; and the 3rd competition for performers on national musical instruments, khanendes and vocalists, in honour of the 120th anniversary of Bulbul, the International Singing Competition held in Austria; the Republican Vocal and Pop Singing Competition (2017); the International Baroque Singing Competition held in France (2018); K-Pop International competition held at the Opera Studio at the Baku Academy of Music (2019); the World Harmony international competition (2020); to name just a few. Currently, I. Nazarov works at the Department of Solo Singing and Opera Training as a senior lecturer at the U.Hajibeyli Baku Academy of Music, at Bulbul Specialized Secondary Music School, and at music school No. 35 named after G.G. Sharoev (11 years of study).

== Scientific activity ==
I.Nazarov is a doctoral candidate at the U. Hajibeyli Baku Academy of Music. The singer repeatedly made speeches at republican and international conferences with articles on the activities of the outstanding vocalist M. Magomayev, and the articles on the same theme were published in a number of scientific journals, as well as he formulated a pop singing bachelor's degree program for students.

== Composer activity ==
İ.Nazarov is also engaged in composing activities. The vocalist is the author of two songs for soloist and piano.

=== Nazarov's songs ===
1. "Beni hor görme, kardeşim!" ("Don't despise me, brother!") (to the words of Ashig Veysel Shatiroglu) (2019).
2. “Ey, təbib” (“Hey, doctor”) (to the words of Nasimi) (2019).

The song "Don't despise me, brother!" performed for the first time at a festival in Turkey in 2019 attracted great interest and received an award. Moreover, the song "Hey, doctor" was performed by the author at the republican competition-festival dedicated to the 650th anniversary of Nasimi held at Baku Academy of Music.

== Honours and awards ==
- Honoured Artist of the Republic of Azerbaijan – March 9, 2017.
- Awarded the Presidential Prize – May 9, 2018, May 10, 2019, and May 7, 2020.
- By the order of the Ministry of Defense was awarded the jubilee medal "100th Anniversary of the Azerbaijani Army (1918–2018)" for the distinction in military service in 2008.
