= Oscar Oiwa =

Brazilian-American visual artist

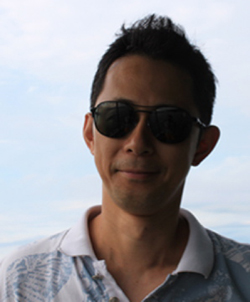
- Summer 2010 Photo by Luna
- Born: August 1965 (age 60); São Paulo, Brazil
- Education: School of Architecture and Urbanism, University of São Paulo
- Known for: painter, visual artist, architect

Oscar Oiwa (in Japanese: 大岩オスカール) is a Brazilian-American visual artist.

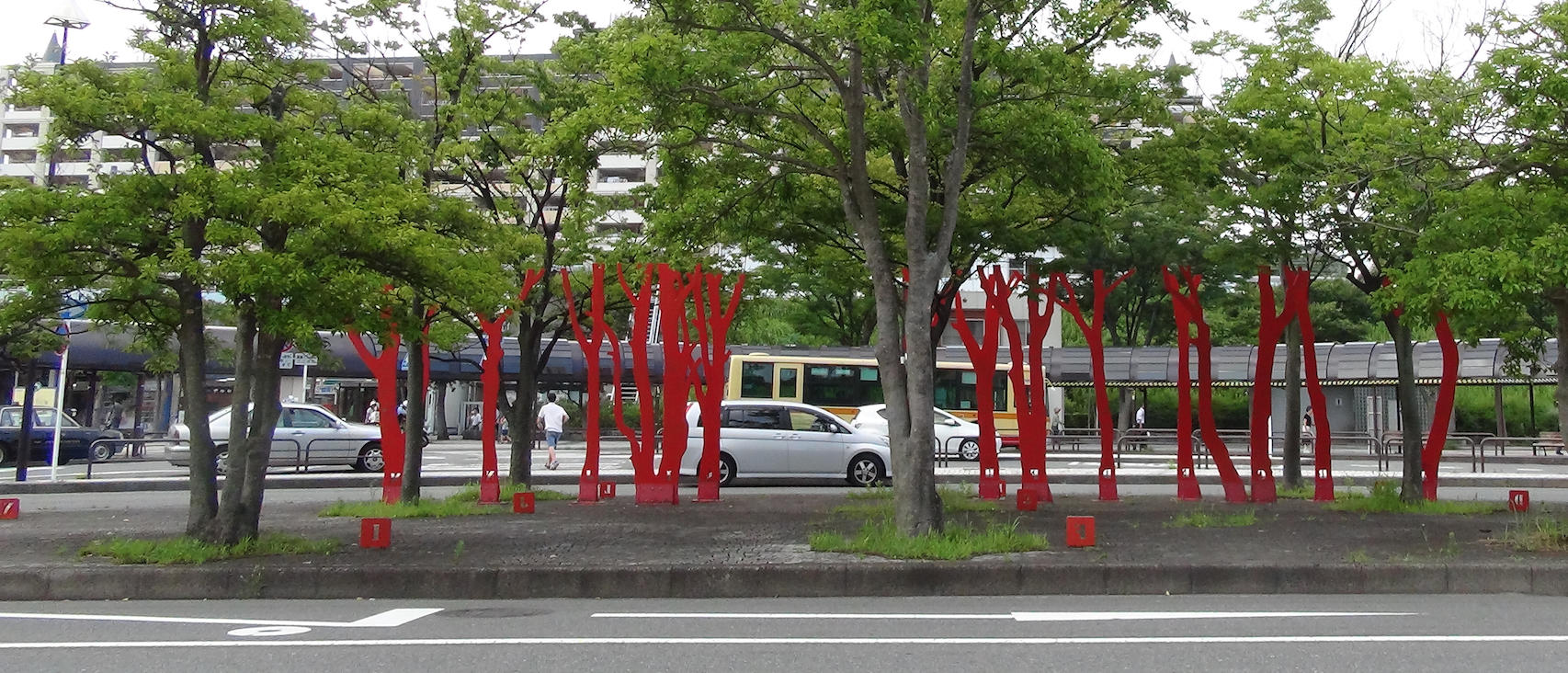
Tree Portrait, 1997, aluminum, paint, height 3m, Hongodai Station, Yokohama

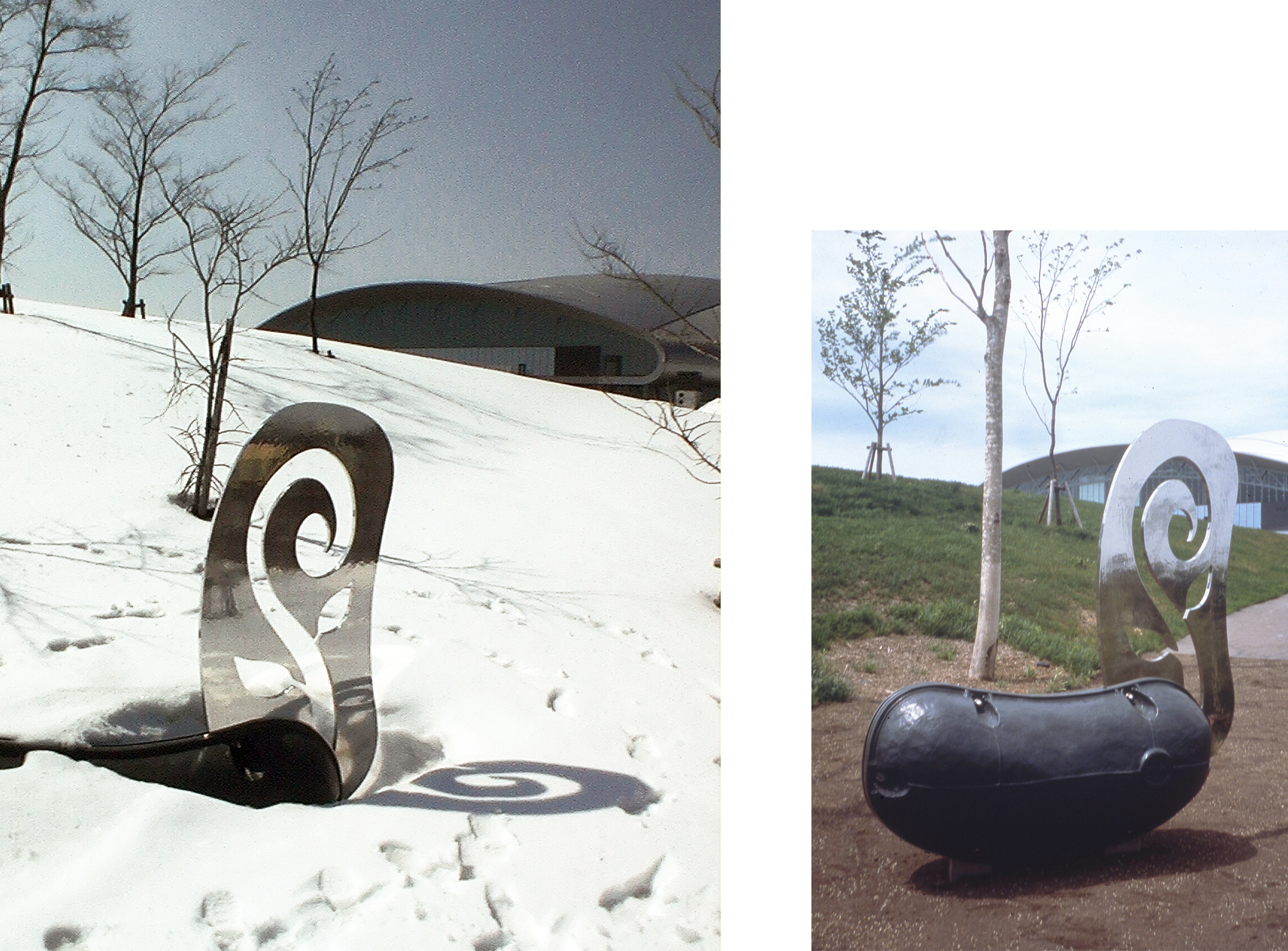
Bean (Feijao), 2000, cast iron, stainless steel, 180 x 230 x 50 cm, Sapporo Dome, Hokkaido

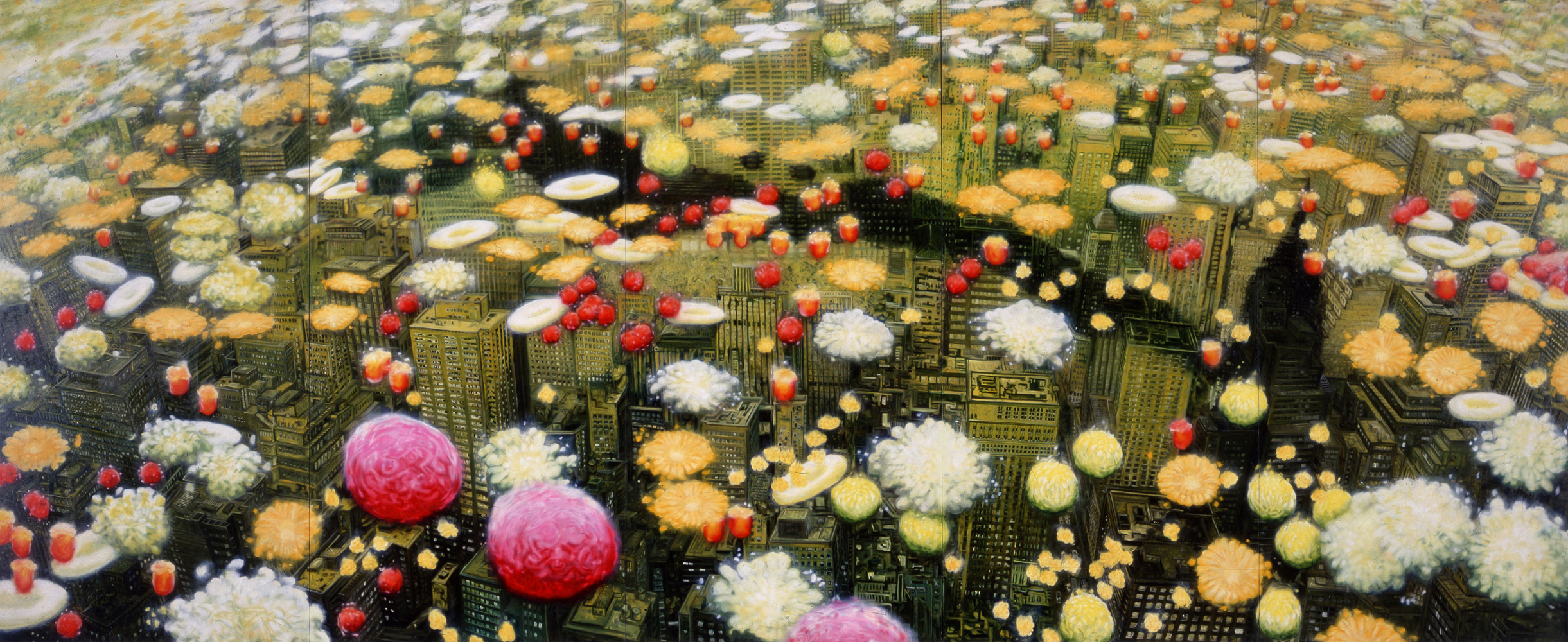
Gardening (Manhattan), 2002, oil on canvas, 227 x 555 cm, The National Museum of Modern Art, Tokyo collection.

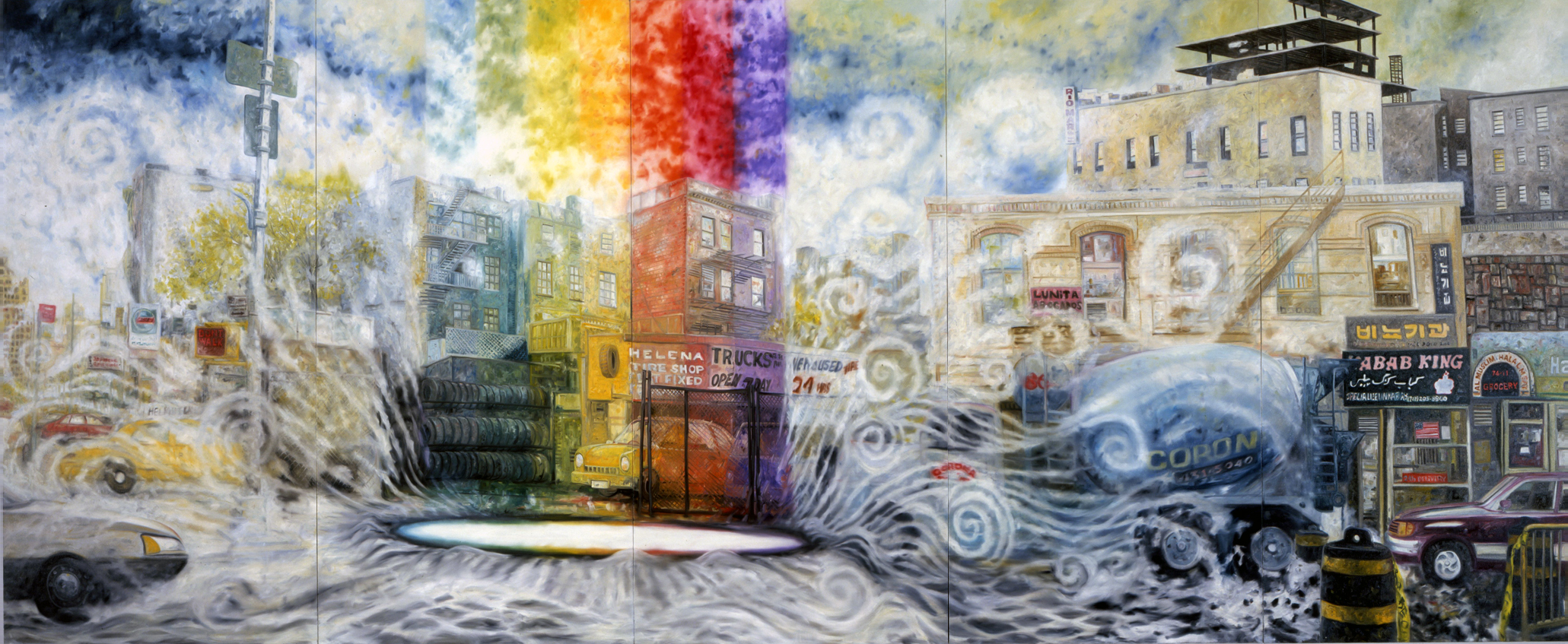
Rainbow, 2003, oil on canvas, 227 x 555 cm, Takamatsu City Museum of Art collection, Kagawa

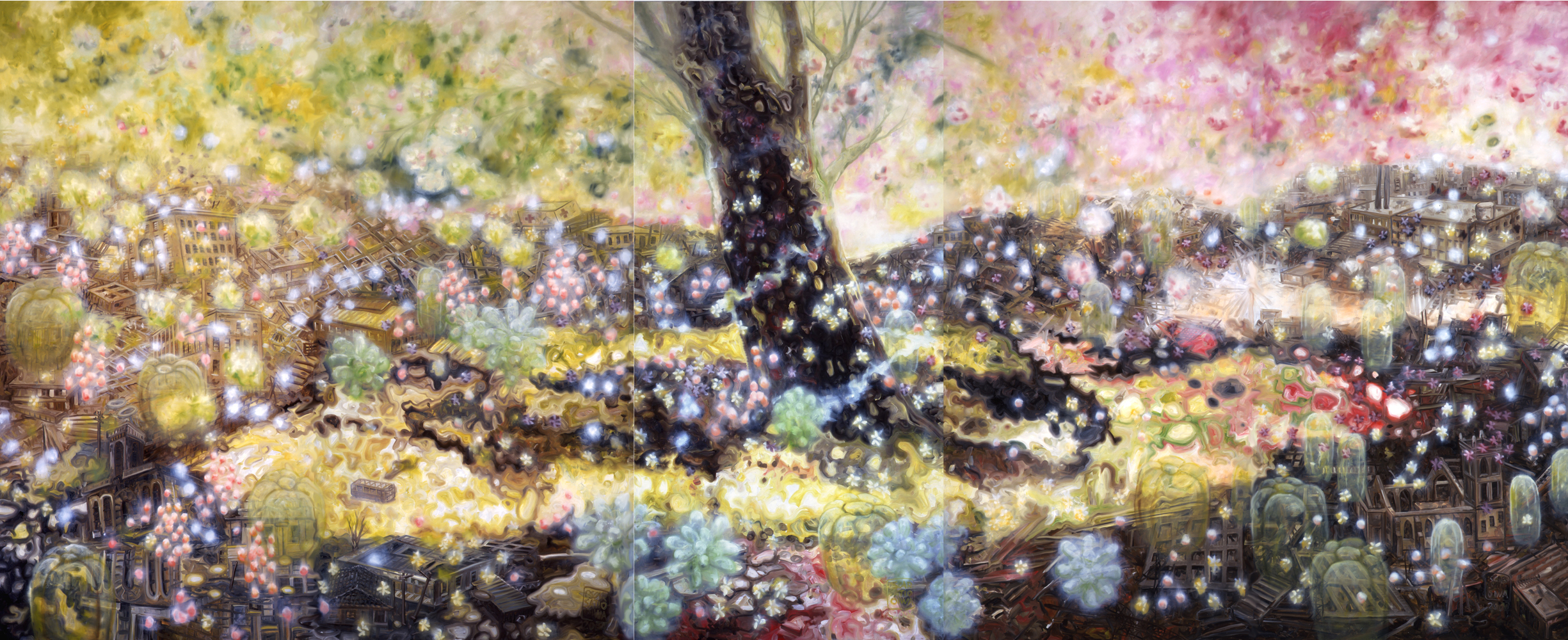
Flower Garden, 2004, oil on canvas, 227 x 555 cm, Hiroshima City Museum of Contemporary Art / private collection, Tokyo

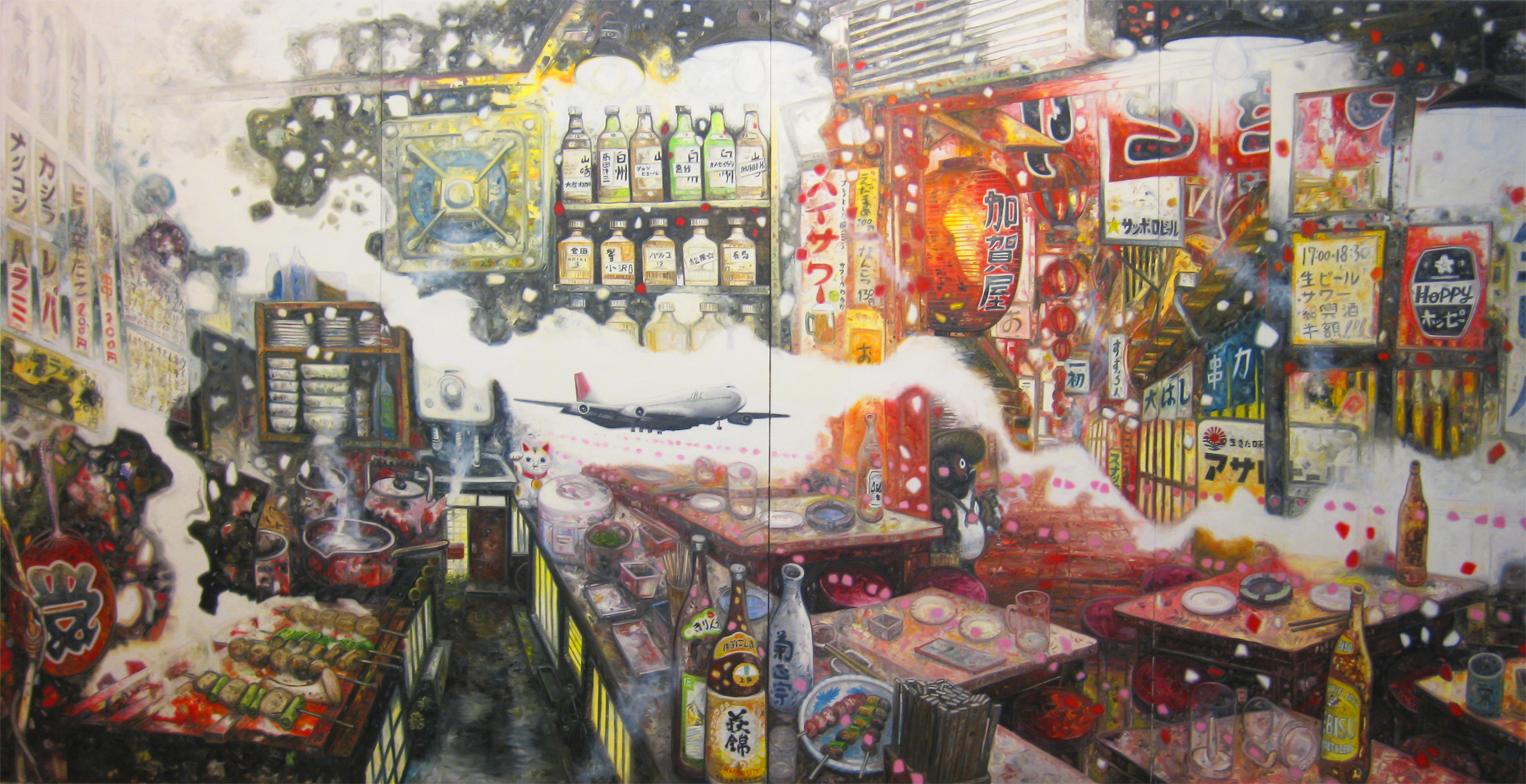
Kita Senju, 2008, oil on canvas, 227 x 444 cm, 21st Century Museum of Contemporary Art collection, Kanazawa

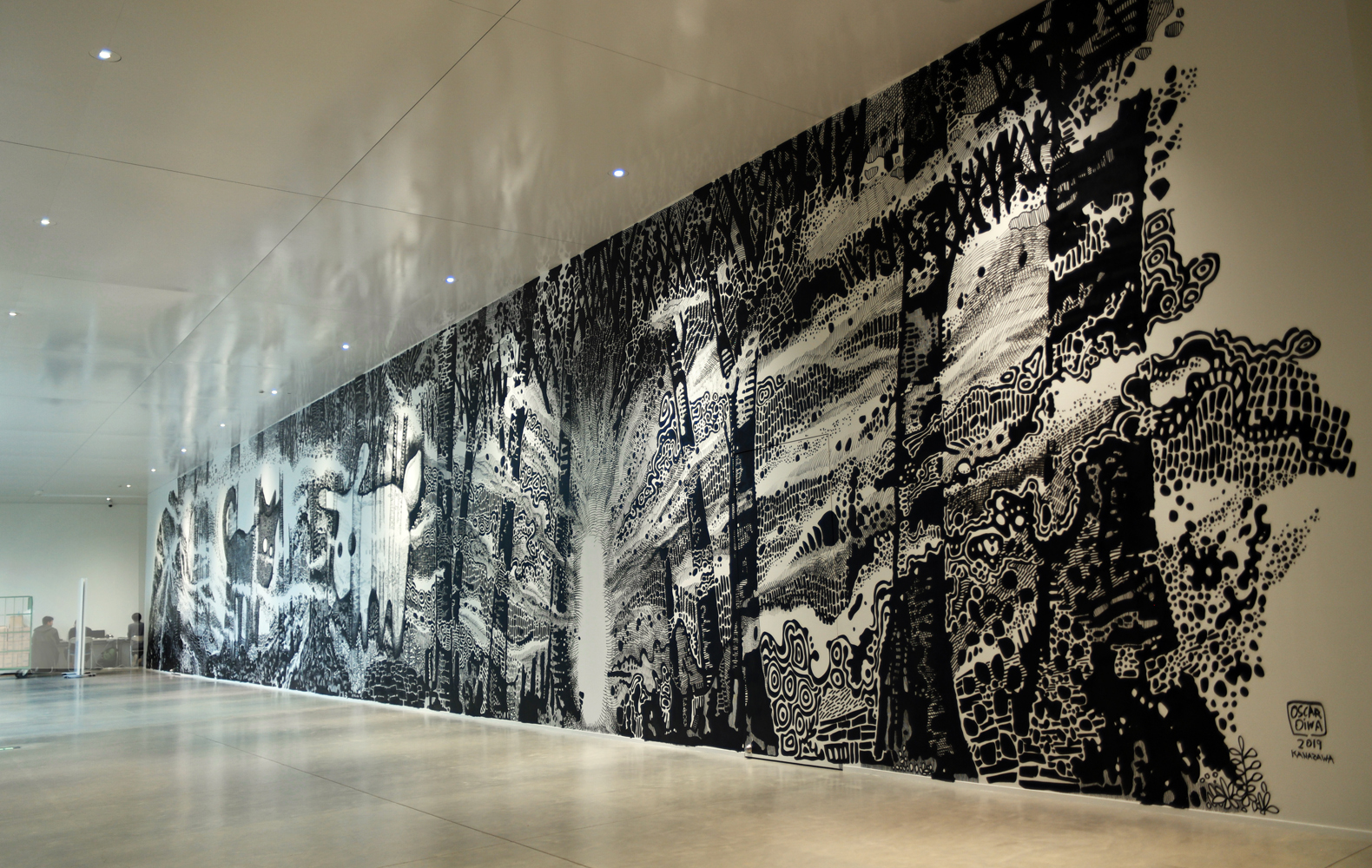
Woods wall drawing, 2019, 4 x 27 meters, 21st Century Museum of Contemporary Art, Kanazawa

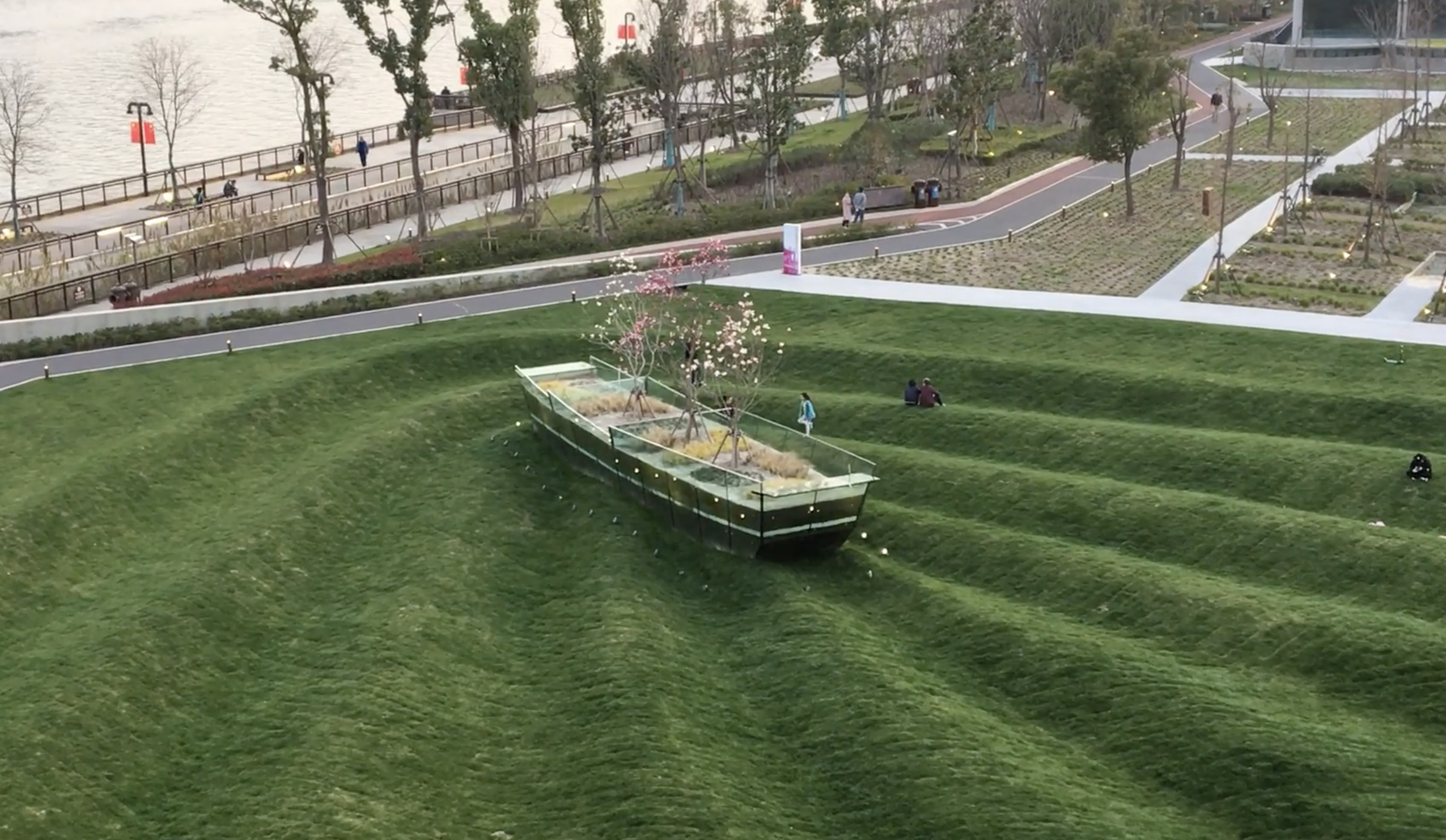
Time Shipper, 2020, Yangpu Riverside Park, Shanghai

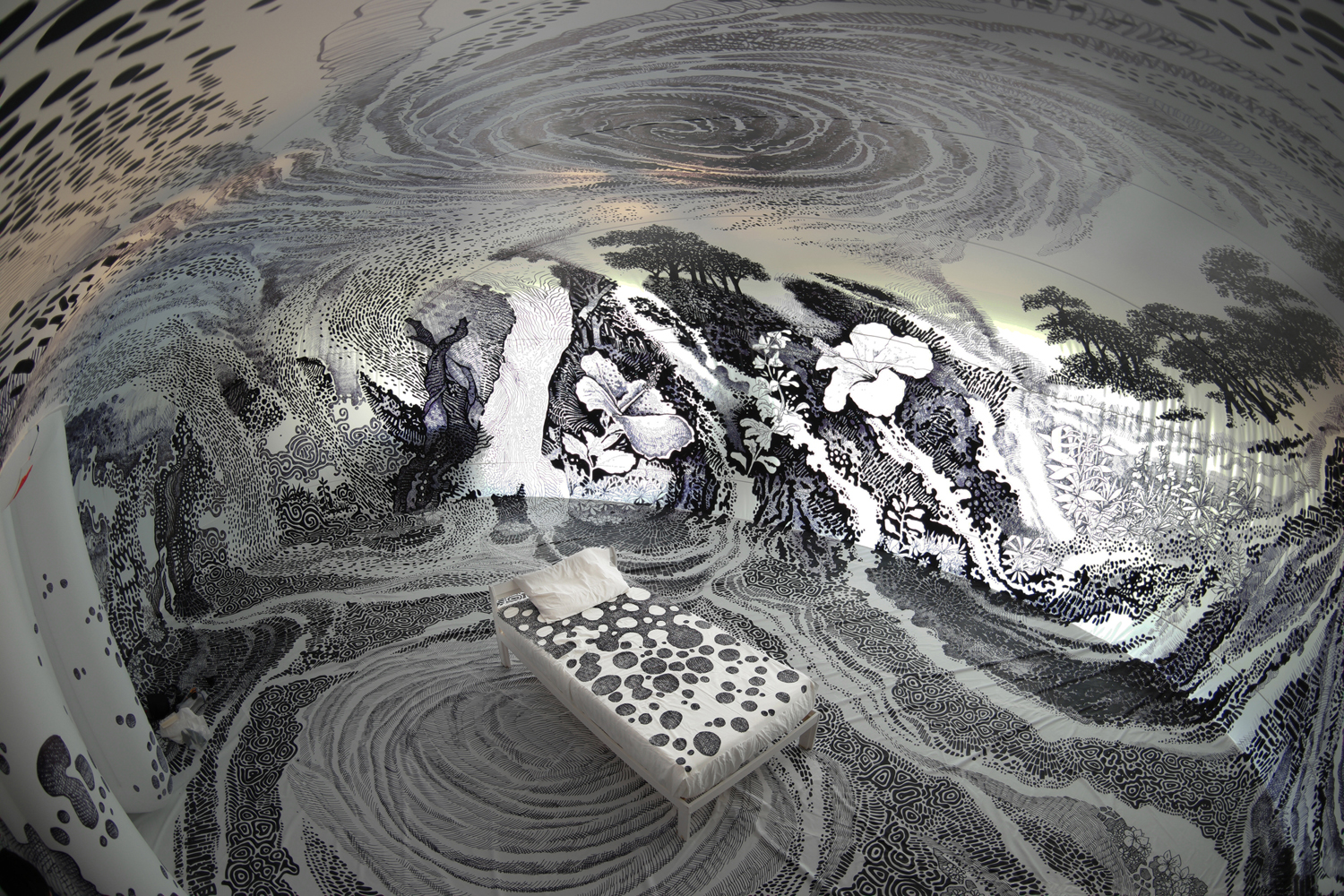
Dreams of a Sleeping World Installation, 2020, University of Southern California, Pacific Asia Museum

== Biography ==
Oscar Oiwa was born in São Paulo, Brazil, to Japanese immigrants. He received his B.F.A. (1989) from the School of Architecture and Urbanism, São Paulo University. Oiwa was influenced by comic books, art, and magazines throughout his youth, as well as the urban environment of his birthplace. He experienced contemporary art during this time exploring the local art scene in São Paulo in nearby galleries and became an assistant at the São Paulo Art Biennial during his college years. Oiwa held his first solo exhibition while he was still in college and soon after participated in the 21st São Paulo Art Biennial (1991). Throughout his career, he has participated in art globally, beginning in the city of his birth, then relocating to Tokyo in 1991 after graduating from university. After ten years in Japan, interrupted by a year spent in London in 1995, he moved to New York City in 2002 and has since made the city his base of operations. Over his career, Oiwa's oeuvre encompasses everything from tradition oil paintings, texts, and art objects to interactive immersive art, experimental VR project, fictional narrative-based installations, public art, and book production.

His artwork has been exhibited worldwide, with works in selected public collections, including but not limited to The National Museum of Modern Art, Tokyo (Tokyo), Museum of Contemporary Art Tokyo (Tokyo), Mori Art Museum (Tokyo), Hiroshima City Museum of Contemporary Art (Hiroshima), 21st Century Museum of Contemporary Art, Kanazawa(Ishikawa), Arizona State University Art Museum (Arizona), Prince Albert II of Monaco Foundation, and University of São Paulo Museum of Contemporary Art (USP). He has received numerous awards throughout his career including Pollock-Krasner Foundation grants, the John Simon Guggenheim Memorial Foundation Fellowship (2001), a grant from the Asian Cultural Council in 2002, and the Gottlieb Foundation Individual Support Grant (2021). In 2019, he receive the Medal of Honor from His Imperial Majesty, the Emperor of Japan.

== Early life (1965–1991), São Paulo ==
Oscar Oiwa was born in São Paulo in 1965 and was raised there, with an early interest in art. He began to enter art competitions in junior high school, winning the grand prize in a poster competition for college students in his final year. As a teenager, he continued to hone his skills, being actively involved in drawing for his school's newspaper, displaying his natural skill and later tendency for caricature, as well as drawing cartoons and continuing to enter and win art competitions of all kinds.

During his college years at the University of São Paulo, his view of the world expanded. While working as an assistant for famous artists at the São Paulo Biennial, where artists such as Keith Haring, Anselm Kiefer, and Tony Cragg were present, he was exposed to contemporary art and was inspired to become an internationally active artist and continued to enter pieces in competitions and used prize money as funds for future projects. During the summer of 1989 at the age of 23, he created Whale1 and Whale 2, highlighting the juxtaposition between reality and illusion of his works during this period with the creation of a painted virtual image of detailed depth on flat Kraft paper. These works are representative of the early stage of his career as an artist, and he exhibited these pieces in the 1991 São Paulo Biennial as an artist representing Brazil. Oiwa continued to participate in small exhibitions and graduated from college in 1989, soon after deciding to relocate to Tokyo in 1991 upon graduation

== Life in Tokyo (1991–2002) ==
Being of Japanese descent and speaking some Japanese, Oiwa moved to Tokyo in 1991 after graduating from university, during the collapse of Japan's economic bubble, with the hopes of broadening his horizons beyond São Paulo's small artistic community. Having studied architecture and urban planning in college, he found work as an assistant at an architectural design office in Tokyo. He enjoyed this work, with the social relevance of architecture unlike the art world. While employed full time, he continued to produce art in his spare time. Despite not being well acclimated to the Japanese art world, he started doing group shows and small solo exhibitions, working hard to increase output and improve the quality of his work and slowly building up his career in Japan.

In 1995, he spent ten months in London as an artist-in-resident as part of a program with the Delfina Foundation, where he adopted oil painting and developed his oil painting skills. It proved to be a valuable learning period, not only as an opportunity to live in Europe but to study European oil paintings in museums, but he was unable to become accustomed to London. This period marked Oiwa's switch in painting style from acrylic to oils, as well as the change from painting on plywood to now cotton canvases. This resulted in also the shift his style took from painting employing solid, hard lines to colorful works with softer lines, resulting in more deeply layered and complex works reflecting greater warmth in his works beyond this point.

Oiwa continued to paint in oils when he returned to Japan and was gradually participating in more group shows in Japanese public art museums such as at the Museum of Contemporary Art Tokyo, and the Shizuoka Prefectural Museum of Art in the early 2000s. This marked a turning point in his career as his artwork also began to sell more and he had more overseas shows. He soon settled into life in Tokyo, but soon decided to move to New York City.

== Life in New York and globalization (2002–present) ==
After obtaining a grant in 2001 provided by the Asian Cultural Council and the John Guggenheim Memorial Foundation, Oiwa planned to move to New York City that year, however with the occurrence of 9/11 and America going to war soon after, he delayed plans until 2002. Moving to New York City was a chance for him to rethink the work he had done in Japan and relationships with people. He re-established his studio in Williamsburg, Brooklyn, and after initially applying to competitions without results, with greater intensity against competition, he focused his energies into the production of his art and in conjunction with meeting people over time, his efforts over time finally reaped their benefits. He now has works displayed globally, across South America and Asia but also beyond, and continues to work in his studio in New York City.

== Themes and style ==
Oiwa's works often derive from observations of the reality occurring around him. This can be meant in the literal sense as he often paints the urban landscape of the cities he has lived in and has visited, but he mixes his own perspectives and imagination into his depictions of the urban world, focusing on what is overlooked. There is often a perspective from above, with Oiwa choosing large-scale works that employ a bird's eye view, or make use of a characteristic drawing method derived from his foundation in architecture.

Oiwa also observes and depicts current-day events and social issues in his artwork filtered through the lens of his experiences. His works encompasses themes including war and immigration, stemming from his family's history of immigration, as well as globalization, nature, and the environment. This are evident in works such as his Gardening series, colorful landscape paintings with multitudes of flowers floating above the cityscape with an underlying themes of nature, urbanization, and war in a layered narrative as well as many other. [] There is also a constant interest in the theme of light and dark, with Oiwa stating that “There would be no light without the dark.” [2] From using reoccurring images of clouds and smoke to dissolve light and dark in his pieces to using a variety of media including composition gold and silver leaf, glitter, and LED lights to both reflect and emit light, he plays with light while boldly making use of the colors produced as a result. In addition to his techniques surrounding the depiction of light in his works, he often also portrays this theme with the motif of the Shadow Cat and Light Rabbit seen in several of his works.

Oiwa's works present the viewer with a world closely familiar and yet completely unexpected. As is often said, it is a world constructed of dissimilar or opposing elements that, although starkly different, coexist.

Many art writers have called his work a criticism of globalization. Oiwa, however, says globalization is not entirely bad.

== Selected exhibitions ==
Oiwa has had more than 60 solo exhibitions worldwide since 1985:

- 2022– “Metropolis”, Nowhere, New York
- 2023- “My Ring”, Art Front Gallery, Tokyo
- 2022– “If I Living in…”, Nowhere, New York
- 2020– “The Dreams of a Sleeping World”, USC Pacific Asia Museum, Pasadena
- 2019– “After Midnight”, Mizuma, Kips & Wada Art, New York
- 2019– “Black and Light”, Cadillac House, New York
- 2019– “Journey to the Light”, 21st Century Museum of Contemporary Art, Kanazawa
- 2019– “Oscar Oiwa”, Hangar Art Center, Brussels
- 2019– “Oscar Oiwa”, Japanese cultural House in Paris (French: Maison de la culture du Japon à Paris), Paris
- 2018- A Light-filled Ginza, Tokyo Gallery, Tokyo
- 2018– “Oscar Oiwa in Paradise-Drawing the Ephemeral”, Japan House, São Paulo
- 2018– “The Light from the Forest”, Keumsan Gallery, Seoul
- 2016– “The World is filled with Light”, Art Front Gallery, Tokyo
- 2011– “After Midnight”, Thomas Cohn Gallery, São Paulo
- 2011– “Oscar Oiwa”, National Art Museum, Rio de Janeiro
- 2009– ”Asian Kitchen”, BTAP, Beijing
- 2008– “The Dreams of a Sleeping World”, Museum of Contemporary Art Tokyo / Fukushima Prefectural Museum of Art, Fukushima / Takamatsu City Museum of Art, Kagawa ( −2009)
- 2007– “Fire Shop”, P.P.O.W. Gallery, New York
- 2006– “Invisible Reflex”, Ikeda Museum of 20th Century Art, Shizuoka
- 2006– “Gardening with Oscar Oiwa”, Arizona State University Art Museum, Arizona ( −2007)

== Publications ==
- Oiwa, Oscar (1995). Art At First Time. Skydoor Inc., Tokyo. ISBN 4-915879-22-4.
- Oiwa, Oscar (2000). ART&ist, Gendaikikakushitsu Publishers, Tokyo. ISBN 4-7738-0014-3.
- Zeitlin, Marylin (2006). Gardening with Oscar Oiwa: New Paintings, Arizona State University Art Museum, Phoenix. ISBN 0-9777624-2-4.
- Chinzei, Yoshimi and Yamashita, Yuji (2008). Oscar Oiwa: Painting in the Age of Globalization, Gendaikikakushitsu Publishers, Tokyo. ISBN 978-4-7738-0801-8.
- Chinzei, Yoshimi; Bucci, Angelo and Minemura, Toshiaki (2009). Asian Kitchen, Tokyo Gallery + BTAP, Tokyo/Beijing. ISBN 978-4-904149-00-3.
- Komatsuzaki, Takuro. Zeitlin, Marylin. Crivelli Visconti, Jacopo and Oiwa, Oscar (2016). The Creation of the World, Kyuryudo Art-Publishing, Co., Ltd., Tokyo. ISBN 978-4-7630-1611-9
- Oiwa, Oscar (2000). Journey to the Light, 21st Century Museum of Contemporary Art, Kanazawa, Kyuryudo Art Publishing, Tokyo. ISBN 9784763019141.
