= The Dini Petty Show season 1 =

List of episodes from The Dini Petty Show, season one, 1989-1990

The Dini Petty Show
- Season 1

Release
- Original network: CTV Television
- Original release: September 11, 1989 – July 6, 1990

Season chronology
- Next → Season 2 (1990-1991)

== Summary ==
Season One of The Dini Petty Show aired on CTV beginning 11 September 1989, although original taping had begun 15 August 1989. The first season of aired Monday-Friday at 10 am, opposite of Petty's previous talk show CityLine on CFTO. Season One consisted of over 200 hour-long episodes hosted by Petty, often focused on current events and social issues. Several episodes were filmed in Regina, Kitchener, Halifax and Ottawa. In addition to interviewing celebrities, politicians, medical experts and authors, Petty also had regular features on home decorating, fashion, health and cooking which featured re-occurring guests, including decorator/publisher Lynda Colville-Reeves (of House & Home magazine), pediatrician Dr. Diane Sacks, psychic C.J. Johnson, cookbook author Bonnie Stern, and John MacKay, editor-in-chief of FASHION Magazine. When interviewed about the intended audience of the show, Petty quipped "I don't have a target audience. If you're Canadian, alive and breathing, and watch television in the mid-morning, watch our show."

== Episode list ==
No.	Title	Originally recorded	Original release date	Prod. code
Pilot01	"Alien Abduction"	15 August 1989	TBA	01-00
First pilot episode of The Dini Petty Show, consisting of interviews with UFO expert Budd Hopkins ("Intruders") and alien abductees Debbie Tomey, Dorothy Wallace, and Betty Stewart and hypnotherapist Dr. David Gottlieb.
Pilot02	"Children Having Children"	16 August 1989	TBA	01-00
Second pilot episode of The Dini Petty Show with guest Michele Russell, who had child at age of 13; Sharon Hart, a youth program coordinator the YWCA; pediatrician Dr. Miriam Kaufman, and interviews street kids teen mothers living in Toronto.
1	"Chemistry of Love"	5 September 1989	TBA	01-01
Featuring Dr. Rhoda Glasberg, and marriage counsellor Dr Alan Lye.
2	"Laughter is the Best Medicine"	6 September 1989	TBA	01-02
Featuring Dr. Mel Borins, Valerie Kalis (humourist).
3	"Private Investigators"	7 September 1989	TBA	01-03
Featuring private investigator Bernie Floyd, and author and private investigator Ralph Broughtbank, Jay J Armes.
4	"Siblings"	8 September 1989	TBA	01-04
Featuring psychologist Louise Kamin.
5	"Addictive Personalities"	9 September 1989	TBA	01-05
6	"Cosmetic Surgery"	12 September 1989	TBA	01-06
7	"Home Decorating"	13 September 1989	TBA	01-07
8	"Aliens"	14 September 1989	TBA	01-08
9	"Nursing Crisis"	15 September 1989	TBA	01-09
10	"Self-Confidence"	18 September 1989	TBA	01-10
11	"Taking the Toxic Out of Your Home"	19 September 1989	TBA	01-11
12	"Fashion"	20 September 1989	TBA	TBA
13	"What Turns Men/Women Off"	21 September 1989	TBA	01-13
14	"The Difficult Child"	22 September 1989	TBA	01-14
15	"Food"	25 September 1989	TBA	01-15
16	"Child Abuse"	26 September 1989	TBA	01-15
17	"Men's New Role"	27 September 1989	TBA	01-17
18	"Home Decorating"	28 September 1989 (?)	TBA	01-18
19	"Fertility"	29 September 1989	TBA	01-19
20	"Addicted to Adultery"	2 October 1989	TBA	01-20
21	"Prostitution"	3 October 1989	TBA	01-21
22	"Dr. Dian Sacks"	4 October 1989	TBA	01-22
23	"Dreams by Kathy Belicki"	6 October 1989	TBA	TBA
24	"Escaping the City"	10 October 1989	TBA	01-24
Filmed in Kitchener, Ontario.
25	"Integration/Education"	11 October 1989	TBA	01-25
Filmed in Kitchener, Ontario.
26	"Witches, Pagans and Magic"	13 October 1989	TBA	01-26
Filmed in Kitchener, Ontario.
27	"Finding Lost Children"	16 October 1989	TBA	01-27
Featuring Ann Chesbro, Colin Maxwell(author), Judy McDonald of Child Find, Bev Murphy (abducted as a child), and Cee Jay Johnson (psychic).
28	"Longevity"	17 October 1989	TBA	01-28
Featuring Dr. Stuart Berger, Judith Kazdan, Ron Weston.
29	"Fashion"	18 October 1989	TBA	01-29
Featuring Monica Schnarre, John MacKay, Judy Argue, Shelly Black, Denis Bouchard, David Govier.
30	"Living Together, Feeling Alone"	19 October 1989	TBA	01-30
Featuring Dr. Dan Kiley.
31	"Pain"	23 October 1989	TBA	01-31
Featuring Dr. Frank Adams, Lorette Riding, Dr. Ian Clark, Marylynne Sequin.
32	"Male Vanity"	23 October 1989	TBA	01-32
Featuring Josie Szczasiuk (social commentator), John MacKay (stylist), Dr Sandy Prichard (plastic surgeon), Fred Weksberg (dermatologist).
33	"Home Decorating"	24 October 1989	TBA	01-33
Featuring Lynda Colville-Reeves.
34	"Stepfamilies"	25 October 1989	TBA	01-34
Featuring Lillian Messenger (Clark Institute), Richard Kitney, Morna Kitney, Ruth Kennedy, Andrea Kennedy, and the Rosalyn Family.
35	"Shortcuts in the Kitchen"	26 October 1989	TBA	01-35
Featuring Bonnie Stern, and author Marg Fraser.
36	"Black Creek Pioneer Village"	27 October 1989	TBA	TBA
Featuring Robert George Kirk and Irene Kirk, Desmond Glynn (historian) Bonnie Stern, Felicity Pope, and Ann Roberts
37	"Live at the Ontario Science Centre"	30 October 1989	TBA	01-37
Hosted at Ontario Science Centre featuring John Falls, Heather Menzies (author), Jim Hayward (computer consultant), and Robert Logan (professor, University of Toronto).
38	"Fashion"	31 October 1989	TBA	01-38
Featuring Miss Canada Robin Lee Ouzunoff, John MacKay, Ray Civello, Maria Pimentel‐Cook (prescriptions, cosmetics), David Govia, and Denis Bouchard.
39	"Bio-ethics"	1 November 1989	TBA	01-39
Featuring Dr Fred Lowy (University of Toronto), George Webster, and Debbie Burnett.
40	"Near Death Experiences"	2 November 1989	TBA	01-40
Featuring Robert Bertram, Dr Raymond Moody, Shannon Ray, Comrie Cleland, and Dr. Melvin Morse.
41	"Another World / Soap Operas"	3 November 1989	TBA	01-41
Featuring agent Lilana Novakovich and actors Joy Bell, Stephen Schnetzer, and Judy Horton.
42	"Children and Learning"	6 November 1989	TBA	01-42
Featuring Dr. Diane Sacks and Ruth Erlick.
43	"Male Strippers"	7 November 1989	TBA	01-43
Featuring Dr. Rhoda Glasberg, Joey Montana, Dream Theme, and Lee Preston.
44	"Aches and Pains"	8 November 1989	TBA	01-44
Featuring Dr. Marek Gavel, Dr. Elaine Dembe, and Dr. Hartly Miltchin.
45	"Home Decorating"	9 November 1989	TBA	01-45
Featuring Lynda Coleville Reeves and Anthony Torrice.
46	"Psychics"	10 November 1989	TBA	01-46
Featuring C. J. Johnson (psychic) and Hassan Jafer.
47	"Is Your Job Making You Sick?"	13 November 1989	TBA	01-47
Featuring Dr Richard Allen, Margaret Cannon, Wendy Newman, and Dr Carol Kanchier.
48	"Consumer"	14 November 1989	TBA	01-48
Featuring Rhonda Maxwell, Michael McKenna, and David Chilton.
49	"Fashion"	15 November 1989	TBA	01-49
Featuring John MacKay, Judy Argue, and Julliet Workington
50	"Teens"	17 November 1989	TBA	01-50
Featuring Kathra Burns, Mike Held, Dean Paras, Rene Shearing, Linda Short, and Randy Rattan.
51	"Native Adoption"	20 November 1989	TBA	01-51
Filmed in Regina, Saskatchewan, featuring Karen McGinn, Chief James O'Watch (Carry the Kettle Band), Lisa Robertson, and Gerry Jacobs.
52	"Hunger"	21 November 1989	TBA	01-52
Filmed in Regina, featuring Professor Graham Riches (author) Gerard Kennedy (Daily Bread Food Bank), Margaret Cuddington, and Doug Archer (mayor of Regina).
53	"Farm Women"	22 November 1989	TBA	01-53
Featuring Audrey Walker (farming wife), Donett Elder, Bill Frazier, and Bob Thomas.
54	"Basement"	23 November 1989	TBA	01-54
Filmed in Regina, about starting your own business featuring Gord Hamilton, Dale Botting, Stephen Sandler, and Dianna Firnesz.
55	"Home Decorating"	24 November 1989	TBA	01-55
Filmed in Regina, featuring Lynda Colville‐ Reeves, Joanne Smith (interior designer), and Doug Gibson (artisan).
56	"David Suzuki"	27 November 1989	TBA	01-56
57	"Bonnie Stern"	28 November 1989	TBA	01-57
Featuring Bonnie Stern, Arnoldo Rampa, and Randy Cogan.
58	"Consumer Rip-Offs"	29 November 1989	TBA	01-58
Featuring Hal Burns (Ontario Travel Register), Michael Barnes (Consumer & Corporate Affairs Canada), and Sgt Larry Kowan (Fraud & Forgery Squad).
59	"Best Toys of the Year"	30 November 1989	TBA	01-59
Featuring Heather Smith ( Canadian Toy Testing Council), Cindy Crawford (editor, Toys & Games), and Dr. Jeff Derevensky.
60	"C.J. Johnson: psychic"	1 December 1989?	TBA	01-60
Featuring psychic Cee Jay Johnson and Henry Gordon (Ontario Skeptics Association).
61	"Christmas Crafts"	4 December 1989	TBA	01-61
Featuring Janet Porter (creative consultant), Linda Henry (Lewiscraft), and Sandra Buckingham (author).
62	"Fitness"	5 December 1989	TBA	01-62
Featuring Jeff Stapleton, Marc Dubois, Dr. Jim Meschino, Dr. Don Clark (University of Regina), and John McRoberts (athlete)
63	"Kids and Christmas"	6 December 1989	TBA	01-63
Featuring Dr. Diane Sacks and Louisa Kamin.
64	"Look to the Future"	December 1989	TBA	01-64
Featuring Tony Hendra (author), Pearl Miller (designer), Gordon Thompson, and Po Ku (furniture designer).
65	"Home Decorating"	7 December 1989	TBA	01-65
Featuring Lynda Colville-Reeves and Sherry Glickman.
66	"Women in Power"	11 December 1989	TBA	01-66
Filmed in Ottawa featuring Sheila Copps, Diane Francis, Jo‐Anne Polak, and Sadie Moranis.
67	"Getting the Love You Want"	12 December 1989	TBA	01=67
Filmed in Ottawa featuring Dr. Harville Hendrix.
68	"Senior Care"	13 December 1989	TBA	01-68
Filmed in Ottawa featuring Dr. William Dalziel, Jacquline Langlois, Barbara Burns, Maria Bohuslawsky, and Dr. Anne Marie Jones.
69	"Fashion"	14 December 1989	TBA	01-69
Filmed in Ottawa featuring John MacKay, Nancy Gall, Sandi Digras, and Laura Peck.
70	"Palm Reader"	17 December 1989	TBA	01-70
Featuring Andrew Fitzherbert.
71	"People Making a Difference"	18 December 1989	TBA	01-71
Featuring Keith and Sally Armstrong, Aruna Papp, Gert McManus, June Caldwell, Franca Carella, and Don Brown.
72	"Bonnie Stern"	20 December 1989	TBA	01-72
73	"Xmas is for Kids"	December 1989	TBA	01-73
Featuring Junior Junk Band, Richard Rothman, Elaine Martin, Kathy Lowinger, and Frank Duffield.
74	"Xmas Celebrities"	December 1989	TBA	01-74
Featuring Karen Kain, Scott Young, Carol Baker, and Derek McGrath.
75	"Home Decorating"	21 December 1989	TBA	01-75
Featuring Lynda Colville-Reeves and Leo LaFerme.
76	"Randy's Xmas Special"	TBA	25 December 1989	01-76
Featuring Ashbury Senior Choir, University of Regina Chamber Choir.
77	"Dreams"	2 January 1990	TBA	01-77
Featuring Dr. Kathy Belicki.
78	"Your Body Image"	TBA	3 January 1990	01-78
Featuring Dr. Fred Boland, Karin Jasper, Carolyn Anderson.
79	"Multiple Personalities"	4 January 1990	TBA	01-79
Featuring Dr. Colin Ross and Dr. Margo Rivera.
80	"Everything That's New"	5 January 1990	TBA	01-80
Featuring John MacKay, Tu Ly, Lida Bihay, Julliet Workington, and Ray Civello.
81	"Kids and TV"	8 January 1990	TBA	01-81
Featuring Dr. Diane Sacks and Jack Livesley.
82	"Thalidomide"	9 January 1990	9 January 1990	01-82
Featuring Tony Melendez, Randy Warren, Paul Murphy, Marie Olney, Dr. Claude Murphy.
83	"Home Decorating"	10 January 1990	10 January 1990	01-83
Featuring Lynda Colville-Reeves, Corrine Kalles.
84	"Mid-Life Crisis"	11 January 1990	11 January 1990	01-84
Featuring Harold Kelman, Henry Regehr, Zelda Abramson.
85	"Reincarnation"	12 January 1990	12 January 1990	01-85
Featuring Colleen Embree, Joe Fisher, Lise St Germain, Dr. Allan Moule.
86	"Cooking"	15 January 1990	15 January 1990	01-86
Featuring Bonnie Stern, Joie Warner, Patricia Quintana, Rajnida.
87	"Creating Intimacy - The Stranger in Your Bed"	16 January 1990	16 January 1990	01-87
Featuring Dr. Rosalie Reichman.
88	"Fashion"	17 January 1990	17 January 1990	01-88
Featuring John MacKay, Brian Bailey, Heather Hobart, Zita Harper, Maggie Woodburn, Denis Bouchard, Harriet Bruiser.
89	"Women in Broadcasting"	18 January 1990	18 January 1990	01-89
Featuring Pamela Wallin, Sandie Rinaldo, Joyce Davidson, Shirley Soloman, Isabel Basset, Nerene Virgin.
90	"How to Stay Sober"	19 January 1990	19 January 1990	01-90
Featuring Jim Christopher, Liam Flanagan, Doreen (AA Member), Jim Milligan.
91	"Curing Cravings"	22 January 1990	22 January 1990	01-91
Featuring Dr. Elliot Abravanel.
92	"Kids are Worth It"	23 January 1990	23 January 1990	01-92
Featuring Barbara Coloroso.
93	"Home Decorating"	24 January 1990	24 January 1990	01-93
Featuring Lynda Colville-Reeves, Michael McKerihen.
94	"Mothers and Daughters"	25 January 1990	25 January 1990	01-94
Featuring Dr. Paula Caplan, Sally Waldo, Carolyn Waldo-Baltzer, Nancy Claitman, Gay Claitman.
95	"Burn Victims"	26 January 1990	26 January 1990	01-95
Featuring Joe Philion, John Parfect, Joan Wieder, Judy Knighton, Heather Schnider, Jacquie Sharpe, Adrienne Alison.
96	"Teenagers with AIDS"	29 January 1990	29 January 1990	01-96
Featuring Sue Johanson, "Charlie", Kirk, Sherry Chuba
97	"The New Traditionalist"	30 January 1990	30 January 1990	01-97
Featuring Mary Jo Osborn, Nanette Steinfeld, Martha Bartley, Dr. Kathy Gildiner, Elizabeth Murphy.
98	"Fashion"	31 January 1990	31 January 1990	01-98
Featuring John MacKay, Chris Blundell, Adrienne Gold, Harry Rosen, Denis Bouchard, Harriet Brusier, and Chris Popovski.
99	"Simon Alexander - Psychic"	1 February 1990	1 February 1990	01-99
Featuring Simon Alexander.
100	"Divorce"	2 February 1990	2 February 1990	01-100
Featuring Dr. Michael Myers (UBC), Susan Malseed, Rick Crumpton, Helen Radovanovic.
101	"Bonnie Stern"	5 February 1990	TBA	01-101
Featuring Bonnie Stern, Margaret Carson, Simon Krasemann, Jonathan Hamblin, Alan Johnson. Filmed on location at the Maritime Museum of the Atlantic (Halifax).
102	"Folklore"	6 February 1990	6 February 1990	01-102
Featuring Russ Lownds, Lou Collins, Rev. John Newton, Ian Currie, Tom Lewis, Clary Croft. Filmed on location at the Maritime Museum of the Atlantic (Halifax).
103	"Alzheimers"	7 February 1990	7 February 1990	01-103
Featuring George Smith, Dr. Nigel Alison, Helen Wright, Doug Wright, Hope Wright, Celeste Gotell. Filmed on location at the Maritime Museum of the Atlantic (Halifax).
104	"Home Decorating"	8 February 1990	8 February 1990	01-104
Featuring Lynda Colville-Reeves, Vicki Bardon, Kitty Pond, Randy Pond. Filmed on location at the Maritime Museum of the Atlantic (Halifax).
105	"Maritime Blues"	9 February 1990	9 February 1990	01-105
Featuring Eric Kierans (economist), Ralph Surette (freelance journalist), Pat Ferguson (unemployed fish plant worker), Al MacDonald (CFB Summerside), Joe Burke (President of the United Miine Workers, District 26), Terry Dimock (returning to the Maritimes). Filmed on location at the Maritime Museum of the Atlantic (Halifax).
106	"Couples and Money"	12 February 1990	12 February 1990	01-106
Featuring Dr. Victoria Felton-Collins (author of "Couples and Money" and Joseph Hart and Evelyn Hart.
107	"Have a Heart...After the Attack"	13 February 1990	13 February 1990	01-107
Featuring Dr. John Vyden (author), Ken Douglas (heart attack victim), Marilyn Douglas (wife), Jim Matera, Audrey Matera, Sheila Limerick (heart attack victims).
108	"Romance"	14 February 1990	14 February 1990	01-108
Featuring Dave Pearson (Science North), Helen Fisher (anthropologist), Celia Scot (Harlequin Book author), Brigit Davis-Todd (senior editor of Temptation Line of books), Barbara Righton (Flare Magazine).
109	"Hockey Moms"	16 February 1990	16 February 1990	01-109
Featuring Alma Clark, Wendel Clark, David Branch (Commissioner of OHL), Jim Coombs (school psychologist), Mike Feely (minor league referee), Dick Todd (OHL coach and manager).
110	"Cosmetic Surgery"	17 February 1990	19 February 1990	01-110
Featuring Dr. Sandy Pritchard (plastic surgeon), Gloria Dezell, Dr. Deborah Smith (vein specialist), Dr. Yasney (cosmetic dentist).
111	"Home Decorating"	20 February 1990	20 February 1990	01-111
Featuring Lynda Colville-Reeves, Cally Bowen (Bowen Davison Designs), Cor Denbleker (Denbleker Remodelling).
112	"Consumer"	21 February 1990	21 February 1990	01-112
Featuring Rhonda Maxwell (consumer expert), Prof. Joseph Levy (York University), Cathy Scott (Dearborn Baby Furnishings), Steve Brannan (appliance expert).
113	"Miss Manners"	22 February 1990	TBA	01-113
Featuring Judith Martin.
114	"The Hero Within by Carol Pearson"	23 February 1990	23 February 1990	01-114
featuring Carol Pearson.
115	"Bonnie Stern"	26 February 1990	26 February 1990	01-115
Featuring Bonnie Stern, Ben Wise (The Inn at Manitou), Tony Aspler (wine connoisseur).
116	"The Disabled"	27 February 1990	27 February 1990	01-116
Featuring Eddie Rice (comedian), Lee Bussard (Cerebral Palsy lecturer), Beryle Potter (artist), Darrel Murphy (quadriplegic), Rhona Mickelson (talent agent), Dragi Sekavicki (lawyer).
117	"Home Environmental Tips"	28 February 1990	28 February 1990	01-117
Featuring Johnny Biosphere (environmental educator), John Sinclair (environmentalist), Colin Isaacs (environmental consultant), Marjorie Lamb (two-minute ecologist).
118	"Fashion"	1 March 1990	1 March 1990	01-118
Featuring John MacKay, Grace Mirabella, Barbara Atkin (fashion designer for Hold Renfrew), Brian Baron (Monroe Hair).
119	"Female Impersonators"	2 March 1990	2 March 1990	01-119
Featuring Christopher Peterson, Gary Dee, Danny Windsor. Filmed at Paparazzi Club.
120	"Border Bargains"	6 March 1990	7 March 1990	01-120
Featuring Harry (Walden Galleria manager), John Winters (retail analyst), Mike Brennan (Bellingham, Washington), Susan Black (Abbotsford Chamber of Commerce), John Johnston (Customs Manager, Niagara District), Irv Weinstein (Buffalo TV news anchor). Filmed in Buffalo.
121	"Dini at the Movies"	6 March 1990	6 March 1990	01-121
Featuring Richard Rotman (Film Critic Metropolis), Jeffrey Hands (filmmaker), Cathy Dunphy (Toronto Star), Robin Ward (video critic, CFTO news).
122	"Beating the Blues"	7 March 1990	TBA	01-122
Featuring Dr. Robert Moreines, Marilyn Nearing (Depressed Anonymous), Teresa Riverso (occupational therapist), Carol, Randy and Laura.
123	"Singles by Susan Page"	8 March 1990	TBA	01-123
Featuring Susan Page, Jan Rowboal, Cobb Barns, Karen McMath, Bryan Cousworth, Peter Casper, Caroline Penale, Tracy Mullan, Steve Vanstone, Glenn Hopkins, Anastasia Philips.
124	"Home Decorating"	9 March 1990	TBA	01-124
Featuring Lynda Colville-Reeves, Arthur Lewis (interior designer).
125	"Amnesia"	TBA	12 March 1990	01-125
Featuring Beverley Slater, author of "Stranger in my Bed"; amnesia patient Jean Ross, neuropsychologist, Dr. Don Stuss, Encephalitis patient Carol McArthur, Ruth Witham, author of "Brutally Honest Family Trauma" and brain injury consultant, neurologist Dr. L. Fornazzari, Ester Vetter and Michael Vetter, aphasia patient.
126	"Smart People"	TBA	13 March 1990	01-126
Featuring Marilyn vos Savant, "world's smartest person" and author of "Brain Building", cognitive psychologist Meredith Daneman, MENSA member Dennis Gray and math wiz Ravi Vakil.
127	"KYTES Street Teens"	TBA	13 March 1990	01-127
Featuring KYTES (Kensington Youth Theatre and Employment Skills) staff and participants, including former street kids Jeff Ince, Melanie Wilson, "Thor", Dave Chant, and Dave Povsons, career counselor Rhonda Rossay, theatre instructor Ned Dickens.
128	"Fashion"	TBA	14 March 1990	01-128
Featuring John Mackey (image consulting), Ronda Rovan (beauty and fashion director of Canadian Living Magazine), Martin Duff (artistic director of Vidal Sasson Canada), Sherry Abbot (P.R. Director, Revlon Canada and Founder of Appearance Concepts Foundation of Canada) and Richard Shaw (President of Liz Claiborne Canada).
129	"Barbara Coloroso"	16 March 1990	TBA	01-129
130	"Roots"	15 March 1990	16 March 1990	01-130
Featuring guests who were adopted, gave children up for adoption, including the Anderson family, Janet Fleet, Valerie Hamilton, Brian Whitehead, adoption counselor Betty Ann Streeter.
131	"Dance Crazes"	21 March 1990	30 March 1990	01-131
Filmed at the Berlin Club, featuring dance ethnologist Nina DeShane, dancer Rex Harrington of the National Ballet of Canada.
132	"Phyllis Diller"	TBA	21 March 1990	01-131
Featuring Phyllis Diller and plastic surgeon Dr. Sandy Pritchard.
133	"Dr. Diane Sacks, pediatrician"	TBA	19 March 1990	01-133
Featuring pediatrician Dr. Diane Sacks and pharmacist Dr. Bob Pritchard.
134	"Jewllery and accessories"	TBA	22 March 1990	01-134
Featuring jeweler Russell Oliver, accessories expert Maggie Woodburn, image consultant John MacKey, marking director of YU fashion Raphael Alyman, and optician Merlyn Josephson.
135	"The Pet Set"	TBA	23 March 1990	01-135
Featuring Eilene Wright, owner of Bowser's Boutique, veterinarian Dr. Paul McClutcheon and cat psychologist Mardie McDonald.
136	"Cooking with Bonnie"	TBA	27 March 1990	01-136
Featuring Bonnie Stern and nutritionist Mary Ann Yaromich.
137	"The Magic Show"	TBA	22 March 1990	01-137
Featuring magician Harry Gordon, and Henry Myeller of the Houdini Magical Hall of Fame.
138	"Inventors"	TBA	28 March 1990	01-138
Featuring inventor Daphne Bailie (inventor of "knifty knees", Dr. Shelly Beauchamp of Women Inventions Project, Patsy Winger (inventor of "pacifinder"), Albert Kral (inventor of "porta bike stand"), Dr. Dennis Colonello (inventor of "The Abdomenizer"), Dinah Christie (inventor of "hot heels"), Randy Wilson (inventor of "Ladder-Saddle" and Gary Svoboda of the Canadian Innovation Centre.
139	"Home Decorating"	TBA	22 March 1990	01-139
Featuring Cor Denbleker of Denbleker Remodelling, Lynda Colville-Reeves and Karen Sachs ("Kritter your walls").
140	"Home Decorating"	TBA	2 April 1990	01-140
Featuring Lynda Colville-Reeves, flower arranger Allan Anderson, B.B. Bargoons, architect Kenny Nickerson, visual marketing consultant Carol Ann Burman.
141	"Fashion: Going Grey"	05 April 1990	17 April 1990	01-141
Featuring Christine Tanabe of Ports International, Marisa De Simone of McCalls Patterns, hairdresser Ray Civello and image consultant John MacKay.
142	"Fashion"	TBA	3 April 1990	01-142
Featuring John MacKay, fashion designer Marilyn Brooks, fashion designer Pat McDonagh, fashion agent Natalie Gangbar and nail expert Karen Serafin.
143	"Dreams"	TBA	4 April 1990	01-143
Featuring dream expert Dr. Kathy Belicki, David Ryback, author of "Dreams that Come True", and Jayne Gackenbach, author of "Control Your Dreams".
144	"Men/Women - Sex/Love"	TBA	4 April 1990	01-144
Featuring psychologist Jonathan Kramer and author Diane Dunaway.
145	"Alternative Medicine"	TBA	5 April 1990	TBA
Featuring Dr. Carolyn Dean, David Bray, practitioner of Traditional Chinese Medicine, Lional Pasen, author of "Thuna-Herbs", Mitsuki Kikkawa, shiatsu master, Dr. Sheila Pennington, author of "Understanding How Your Mind Can Heal Your Body" and chiropractor Elaine Dembe.
146	"Victims of Vanity"	TBA	6 April 1990	01-146
Featuring Michael Schwab of the Canadian Vegans for Animal Rights, Linda Dickenson, author of "Victims of Vanity", Nancy Taylor of The Body Shop, Canada, Bernie Ross Jr. of Frank T. Ross and Sons, Michael O'Sullivan of the World Society for Protection of Animals and nutritional scientist Dr. Carol Greenwood.
147	"The Home Show"	9 April 1990	TBA	01-147
Featuring Lynda Colville-Reeves, interior designer Arthur Lewis, architect Randall Guthrie, designer John Shields, marketing manager George McCabe and Sue Pimento of Selective Home Products.
148	"Arthur Hailey"	TBA	10 April 1990	01-148
Featuring author Arthur Hailey, editor and W5 host Bill Cunningham, CTV anchor Lloyd Robertson, Arthur Hailey's wife Sheila Hailey.
149	"Family Gatherings"	TBA	11 April 1990	01-149
Featuring Bozana Gregoire of Black's Photo Corporation, Frank Sroka of the Toronto School of Home Video, family counselor from Flemington Health Centre Ed Bader, and Noel Elliot of the Genealogical Research Library.
150	"Ballet"	TBA	16 April 1990	01-150
Featuring artistic director of the National Ballet of Canada Reid Anderson, principal dancers Karen Kain, Gizella Witkowsky and Rex Harrington, footwear supervisor Carol Beevers, artistic director of the National Ballet School Mavis Staines, school founder Betty Oliphant, Chan Hon Goh of the corps de ballet and dancer Kevin Pugh.
151	"Bioethics and Fertility"	16 April 1990	17 April 1990	01-151
Featuring artistic director of the National Ballet of Canada Reid Anderson, principal dancers Karen Kain, Gizella Witkowsky and Rex Harrington, footwear supervisor Carol Beevers, artistic director of the National Ballet School Mavis Staines, school founder Betty Oliphant, Chan Hon Goh of the corps de ballet and dancer Kevin Pugh.
152	"Amazing Adventures"	17 April 1990	18 April 1990	01-152
Featuring Jeff MacInnes who sailed the Northwest Passage, Fiona McCall, who sailed around the world, Paul Howard, who sailed around the world and Don Starkell, who canoed to South America.
153	"Brian Tracy"	18 April 1990	19 April 1990	01-153
Featuring motivational speaker Brian Tracy.
154	"Trading Places"	19 April 1990	23 April 1990	01-154
Featuring telephone operator Bernard Pollard, kindergarten teacher David Wong, early childhood educator Nelson Hillier, secretary John Parkin, student Annette McIntosh in WITT (Women in Trades Training) Program, paternity rights activist Shalom Schachter, guidance counselor Jan Robson, Colin Morrison, Executive Director of Industry Education Foundation, Hilda Zimmer, the Witt Program Coordinator and Mavis Wilson, Minister responsible for Women's Issues.
155	"Cooking with Bonnie Stern"	20 April 1990	25 April 1990	01-155
Featuring Bonnie Stern, consumer expert Rhonda Maxwell and nutritionist Rosie Schwartz.
156	"Battered Women"	23 April 1990	24 April 1990	01-156
Featuring Dr. Lenore Walker, author of "Terrifying Love, Brian Vallee author of "Life with Billy", family law lawyer Penny Jones, and Margaret Campbell of the YWCA.
157	"Weight Control"	24 April 1990	25 April 1990	01-157
Features Sandra Lopez, author of "U Factor Weight Management."
158	"Plea for Help"	25 April 1990	26 April 1990	01-158
Featuring Mrs. Phillipa Lue, Elizabeth Lue's mother, Dr. Joseph Wong Chairman of the Elizabeth Lue Campaign, Julie Ho Tsung, Elizabeth's aunt, Christine Eberhardt, Lindsay's mother, Kathy Duval, Melissa's mother, Eileen Young, transplant coordinator at Toronto Western Hospital, Cheryl Rosell, Executive Director of MORE Program and Trish Wood of "As It Happens."
159	"Things That Go Bump in the Night"	26 April 1990	27 April 1990	01-159
Featuring John Robert Columbo of "Mysterious Encounters", Niki Bainbridge of "The Murray House", Mark Freeman and Whitney Freeman (live in a haunted house) and Dr. Joe Nickell.
160	"Epstein Barr"	27 April 1990	7 May 1990	01-160
Featuring Francis Walmsley and Arlene Wilcox, Epstein-Barr sufferers, Lise Durouchers in recovery from Epstein-Barr, Dr. Byron Hyde a specialist in chronic fatigue syndrome and Dr. Rodrigo Rodriguez.
161	"Hollywood Northwest"	30 April 1990	1 May 1990	01-161
Featuring Alex Beaton, VP of Channel Films, Barry Weitz Executive Producer of "Passing Thru Veils", Ian Caddell of Reel West Magazine, Michael Rechtshaffen of The Hollywood Reporter, Diane Neufeld, Director of B.C. Film Commission, Stephen Cannell, Jim Byrnes, actors on Wiseguy and John H. Brennan, actor in Bordertown. Filmed on location in Vancouver.
162	"The Changing Face of Vancouver"	1 May 1990	2 May 1990	01-162
Featuring BCTV reporter Colleen Leung, Elizabeth Raines, real estate agent Andrea Eng, architect Jim Cheng, Vancouver alderwoman Carole Taylor, "concerned citizens" Brian Kerzner and Eric Watt, Stephen Leung and Karl Ng. Filmed on location in Vancouver.
163	"The Environment"	1 May 1990	4 May 1990	01-163
Featuring Andrea Miller, president of WHEN, Joe Foy and Adrienne Carr of Western Canadian Wilderness Commission, John Bassingthwaite of SHARE B.C., Glen Globeck, Kevin Hunter, and Jeff Broughton of MacMillan Bloedel, environmentalist Paul George, John McCandless of Lytton and Mount Currie Bands, Willard Wells of Mount Currie band and Jeff Gibbs of the Environmental Youth Alliance. Filmed on location in Vancouver.
164	"Home Decorating"	2 May 1990	3 May 1990	01-164
Featuring Lynda Colville-Reeves, interior designer Robert Leddingham, home owner Jacqui Herrendorf, Dawn Thomson Wildeman of VanHerrick's Environmental Planting and furniture maker William Switzer. Filmed on location in Vancouver.
165	"Sleeping Disorders"	7 May 1990	8 May 1990	01-165
Featuring Rose Skater, Dr. Peter Hauri Director of the Insomnia Program at the Mayo Clinic, Shirley Linde, co-author of "No More Sleepless Nights" and Dr. Jeffrey Lipsitz of the Sleep Disorders Centre of Metro Toronto.
166	"Grandmothers"	8 May 1990	9 May 1990	01-156
Featuring Lanie Garter, a professional grandmother, Ruth Isbister, lawyer Daniel Melamed and Joan Brooks, president of the GRAND (Grandparents Requesting Access N' Dignity) Society.
167	"The Part Time Solution"	9 May 1990	10 May 1990	01-167
Featuring Chris Cole, Susan Ross, Charlene Canape, author of "The Part Time Solution", Alison Brown and Sandra Keeso-Hall.
168	"Fashion"	10 May 1990	11 May 1990	01-168
Featuring Diane Hatze-Petros of Addition-Elle Inc., Irene Moalowaty of Pennington's, Trish Stuebing of Liptons, Dr. Buyer, Robert Hall of Brylcreem, Andrea Pfister and David Markowitz of Capezio.
169	"Over 50 and Fabulous"	11 May 1990	14 May 1990	01-169
Featuring Esther Kitkin a mature student, Blanche Johnston a runner up for "Ms. Goodage", Dr. Richard Earle, author of "Your Vitality Quotient", an educational gerontologist Debby Vigoda, Harry Rubinoff of HomeLink, and Nancy MacKenzie, coordinator of Kelly Services.
170	"What Men Won't Tell You"	15 May 1990	TBA	01-170
Featuring Bob Berkowitz author of "What Men Won't Tell You, But Women Need to Know" and Dr. Judy Kuriansky author of "How to Love a Nice Guy."
171	"Body Building"	15 May 1990	16 May 1990	01-171
Featuring Rita Boehm, 1989 Canadian Heavyweight champion, Laura Binetti, 1989 overall champion, Ribin Rich, National Heavyweight competitor, Steve Paul, 1989 Ontario Heavyweight champion, Robert Kennedy body building guru, Dr. Doug Richards, sports medicine expert, Raefella Meinhausen, Canada's youngest body builder, Tom Nojumi, a 15 year old body builder, Pat Falconi, a power lifter and bodybuilder, and Tim Marshall, a body builder.
172	"Home Decorating"	16 May 1990	17 May 1990	01-172
Featuring Lynda Colville-Reeves, publisher of Canadian House & Home, Cor Den Bleker, of Den Bleker Remodelling, Katherine Cappadocia of New Image Design Systems, and Marjorie Mason Hogue of Pineridge Nursery.
173	"Channeling"	18 May 1990	17 May 1990	01-173
Featuring Rik Thurston, channeling "Mikaal", Alexander Blair Ewart, publisher of Dimension Magazine, Joe Fisher author of "Hungry Ghosts", and channelers Michael Pfister, Anne Morse and Bart Smit.
174	"How To Be Funny"	18 May 1990	21 May 1990	01-174
Features Valerie Kates a humourologist, Bob Kirk and Ellen Hitchcock of the Out of the Way Players, Mark Zeifman a 12 year old comedian and Tim Conlon and actor and comic.
175	"Dr. Dianne Sacks"	18 May 1990	22 May 1990	01-175
176	"Fashion"	22 May 1990	23 May 1990	01-176
Featuring Rhonda Rovan, fashion director at Canadian Living Magazine and Judy Argue of Colours International.
177	"Healthy Eating"	23 May 1990	24 May 1990	01-177
Featuring Dr. Ronald G. Cridland, head of a health promotion clinic, Daniel Duffy an environmental lecturer, Dr. James D'Adamo, author of "The D'Adamo Diet" and Lorraine Landry a macrobiotic cook.
178	"Down Syndrome"	24 May 1990	25 May 1990	01-178
Featuring actor David MacFarlane, Lyn Symons, Barbara Bain, Mary Ellen Jones, Dr. Robert Haslam, Pediatrician-in-chief at Hospital for Sick Children, Ann Archer, research assistant at the University of Western Ontario and David Naismith of Circle of Friends.
179	"Twins Raised Apart"	25 May 1990	28 May 1990	01-179
Featuring Tony Milasi, Roger Brooks, Dr. Thomas Bouchard, Professor of Psychology, Keith Heitzmann, Jacob Hellbach, and Dr. Neil Weiner, Professor of Psychology.
180	"Rabbi Kushner"	28 May 1990	29 May 1990	01-180
Featuring Rabbi Harold Kushner author of "Who Needs God."
181	"Miracles"	29 May 1990	30 May 1990	01-181
Featuring Dr. Johnathan Hellmann, clinical director of N.I.C.U., Brian Cox, Debbie Cox, Kelly Bray, Jeff Bray, Kathy Cannon, Ashley Dyer, physiotherapist Joe Ashwell, Carolyn Dyer and Stephen Dyer.
182	"Home Decorating"	30 May 1990	31 May 1990	01-182
Featuring Lynda Colville-Reeves, Ivan Lynch, Ted Whelan, Marjorie Mason Hogue.
183	"Teenagers"	1 June 1990	3 June 1990	01-183
Featuring Barbara Coloroso, author of "Winning at Parenting."
184	"Non-Traditional Marriage"	4 June 1990	TBA	01-184
Featuring actress Elke Sommer, psychotherapist Jane Walker, Jean Bowman who has a commuter marriage, Valerie Gibson, who married a younger man, Courtland Shakespeare who married an older woman, Valerie Mannond who married an older man, David Langlotz, a house-husband, and Sysan Langlots, who supports husband financially.
185	"Cooking"	4 June 1990	5 June 1990	01-185
Featuring Bonnie Stern.
186	"Psychic"	6 June 1990	5 June 1990	01-186
Featuring psychic Simon Alexander.
187	"Trouble with Canada"	6 June 1990	7 June 1990	01-187
Featuring former CTV News anchor Tom Gould, former provincial court judge Marjorie Bowker, Bill Gairdner, author of "Trouble with Canada", independent Quebec journalist Lise Bissonnette, St. John's NFLD radio host Andy Wells, and national editor of Maclean's Magazine, Chris Wood.
188	"Birth Order and You"	7 June 1990	8 June 1990	01-188
Featuring Dr. Ronald Richardson and Lois Richardson, co-authors of "Birth Order and You", and members of the Matthews family, and actors Harvey Atkin and Celia Atkin.
189	"Entrepreneurs"	08 June 1990	11 June 1990	01-189
Featuring 13 year old entrepreneur "Heather McCready", Herve de Jordy, author of "On Your Own", Colleen Klein, CEO of Chipco Canada Inc., Judy Deforest, "The Bag Lady", Stuart Butts, Chairman and CEO of Xenos Group, George Mallette, President of Early Bird Ecology and Bait Farms.
190	"Soap Stars"	11 June 1990	12 June 1990	01-190
Featuring actors John Aprea, Kevin Carrigan, and Kale Browne of "Another World."
191	"Male Fashions"	12 June 1990	13 June 1990	01-191
Featuring image consultant John MacKay, Richard Crisman of The Gap, Darlene Gould of Aramis, Arlene Bynon host on CHFI Radio, and broadcaster and writer Micki Moore.
192	"Foster Child Crisis"	13 June 1990	14 June 1990	01-192
Featuring Martyn Kendrick, author of "Nobody's Children," Faye Martin of the Pape Adolescent Resource Centre (Toronto, Ont.), childcare worker Wayne Smith, Dave Karenaghan a former foster child, Kathi Fraser, foster parent, Karen McKinly, a former foster child, foster parents Rod Kitchen and Shirley Kitchen, and Roy Wash of Children's Aid Society in Brantford, Ontario.
193	"Animal Survival"	14 June 1990	15 June 1990	01-193
Featuring Michael O'Sullivan of World Society for Protection of Animals, author and naturalist R. D. Lawrence, and Dr. Red Reitsma, director of Ontario Humane Society in New Market, Ontario.
194	"Stress"	15 June 1990	18 June 1990	01-194
Featuring air traffic controller Arlene Yakeley, intensive care nurse Jennie Ferguson, mother of triplets Sue Hunter, Jon Kabat-Zinn author of "Full Catastrophe Living", stress therapy patient Rita Chaiken, juggling lawyer Stephen grant, Bob Woodburn author of "The Instant Juggling Book," and Peter McGugan, author of "Beating Burnout."
195	"Raising Sexually Healthy Children"	18 June 1990	19 June 1990	01-195
Featuring Lynn Leight, author of "Raising Sexually Healthy Children," sex educator with the Scarborough Board of Education Sue Rowan, Laurie and Mary Jones, parents of a lesbian daughter, and Ann Rutledge, parent to a gay son.
196	"The World of Alfred Sung"	19 June 1990	20 June 1990	01-196
Featuring fashion designer Alfred Sung, PR rep. Cheryl Rice Miller, and image consultant John MacKay.
197	"Schizophrenia"	20 June 1990	21 June 1990	01-197
Featuring Rickie Flach Hartman, Dr. Frederick Flach, Dr. Anne Bassett, psychotherapist Dr. Stanley Gruben, Clem Martini, and Marie Hayes.
198	"Pet Set"	21 June 1990	22 June 1990	01-198
Featuring owners of purebred dogs and cats, including Sharon Gibson (ragdoll), Tony Brady (Bengal), Hazel Pickle (Devon Rex) Linda Birk (sphinx), Paul Guitard (Siberian husky) as well as George Wells of Ralston Purina, Chico Ezchiels of Aquarium Services, Patsy Bloom of Pet Plan insurance, veterinarian Dr. Paul McCutcheon and Dana Boone of P.J.'s Pet Centres.
199	"Home Decorating"	22 June 1990	25 June 1990	01-199
Featuring Lynda Colville-Reeves, publisher of Canadian House & Home, Cor Denbleker of Denbleker Remodelling Services, and specialty decorator Adrienne Zylberbert.
200	"Fashion"	25 June 1990	26 June 1990	01-200
Filmed at the West Edmonton Mall featuring image consultant John MacKay, Judy Rokovetsky, owner of "Below The Best," Edmonton designer Deirdre Hackman, Diane Gibbs and Lynn Holland, owners of "Kids Stuff Etcetera."
201	"Juvenile Justice"	26 June 1990	27 June 1990	01-201
Filmed at the West Edmonton Mall featuring young offenders, Peter Nicholson of the Edmonton Young Offender Centre, psychologist Georg Pugh, Kim Pate of the John Howard Society, Hugh Richards, staff sergeant of "Shopcop Program," Maria David Evans, operating manager of Alternative Measures Program and Doug McNeill.
202	"That's Living"	27 June 1990	28 June 1990	01-202
Filmed at the West Edmonton Mall featuring psychologists Dr. Henry Janzen, Dr. John Paterson, and Dr. Carl Blasko.
203	"Home Decorating"	28 June 1990	2 July 1990	01-203
Featuring Lynda Colville-Reeves, publisher of Canadian House & Home, Julie Mitchell of the Energy Management Branch of Ontario Hydro, Marjorie Mason Hogue of the Pine Ridge Garden Gallery, and Cor Denbleker of Denbleker Remodelling.
204	"The Wife-in-Law Trap"	3 July 1990	4 July 1990	01-204
Featuring ex-wives Marilyn and Ria and author Ann Cryster ("The Wife-in-Law Trap.")
205	"Kids and Summer"	4 July 1990	5 July 1990	01-205
Featuring Heather Smith of the Canadian Toy Testing Council, Patricia Janzen of Canadian Safety Council, Joanne Cooper Executive Director of Volunteer Centre for Metro Toronto, Teri Degler and Yvonne Kason, co authors of "Love, Limits and Consequences" and Phyllis Yaffe, VP Marketing of OWL Magazine.
206	"Bye Bye Barbecue"	5 July 1990	6 July 1990	01-206
Featuring CTV news anchor Lloyd Robertson, Jack Kwinter of Kwinter hot dogs, Rose Murray of Foodland Ontario, Sherry Mallen of Perrier, and Dini Petty Show production staff and reoccurring guests including: Deborah Boland, Jackie Bynon, Barb Williams, Heather Ryall, Randy Gulliver, Diana D'Amello, Patti McCullough-Polecrone, Lynda Colville-Reeves.
