= The Dini Petty Show season 2 =

Episodes of the Canadian talk show for 1990–91

The Dini Petty Show
- Season 2

Release
- Original network: CTV Television
- Original release: September 1990 – July 1991

Season chronology
- ← Previous; Season 1 (1989-1990) Next → Season 3 (1991-1992)

== Summary ==
Season Two of The Dini Petty Show aired on CTV between September 1990 and July 1991. Season Two consisted of over 200 hour-long episodes hosted by Petty, following the convention of having three segments per episode filmed in front of a live audience. The show sold tickets to live audience members, filming throughout the week at 1:00pm. Several episodes were filmed in Saskatoon, Regina, Banff, Winnipeg, Vancouver, and Ottawa. In addition to interviewing celebrities, politicians, medical experts, soap opera stars and authors, Petty also had regular features on home decorating, fashion, health and cooking which featured re-occurring guests, including decorator/publisher Lynda Colville-Reeves (of House & Home magazine), culinary expert Bonnie Stern, clinical psychologist Dr. Cathy Gildiner, and John MacKay, editor-in-chief of Fashion Magazine.

== Episode list ==
No.	Title	Originally recorded	Original release date	Prod. code
207	"Orphans Overseas"	28 August 1990	10 September 1990	02-001
Featuring Maria Levi, Bill Levi and Peter Davenport, Romanian children adopted by Canadians; reporter Catherine Dunphy; Cheryl Magnussen, adoptive parent; Mary Lynne Conzelman of the Christian Children's Fund; Don Scott of World Vision Canada; and Constintin Lacatus of a Romanian orphan support group.
208	"Daredevils"	2 September 1990	11 September 1990	02-002
Featuring Bill Cole (jumps without parachute); local historian Joe Krar; Dave Munday (went over Niagara Falls); racecar driver Katheryn Teasdale; and stuntman Spanky Spangler.
TBA	"Bad Dates"	29 August 1990	12 September 1990	02-003
Featuring Carole Markin, author of Bad Dates; actor John C. McGinley; comedian/actor Bobby Collins; Andrea Reynolds, author of Great Dates; relationship expert Micki Moore and actor Daniel Baldwin.
TBA	"When Things Get Out of Control"	31 August 1990	17 September 1990	02-004
Featuring Alexandra Pollock, a resident of Kuwait; psychologist Dr. Henry Janzen; psychiatrist Dr. John Patterson; Nina Brims, a widow; and Phil MacNeil, who was laid off after 28 years of service.
TBA	"Jealousy"	31 August 1990	TBA	02-005
Featuring Sherry, a victim of jealousy; psychologist Dr. John Patterson; psychiatrist Dr. Carl Blashko; psychologist Dr. Henry Janzen.
TBA	"Criminal Payoffs"	10 September 1990	13 September 1990	02-xx
Featuring Sharon Rosenfeldt and Gary Rosenfeldt, whose son Daryn was murdered; lawyer Jim McNeney; Ian Mulgrew, author of Final Payoff: The True Price of Convicting Clifford Olson and criminal lawyer Earl Levy.
TBA	"Fall Fashions"	11 September 1990	20 September 1990	02-xxx
Featuring image consultant John MacKay and Shelley Black of Flare Magazine.
TBA	"When good Kids Go Bad"	16 November 1990	20 November 1990	02-xxx
Featuring Dr. Stanton E. Samenow, author of Before It's Too Late; Ann Hawkin, member of the Association of Parent Support Groups; physical health educator Randy Ruttan; school social worker Doug McLachlan; and Prem Gupta, founder of Tough Talk.
TBA	"Perfect Health"	17 September 1990	21 November 1990	02-xxx
Featuring Deepak Chopra, author of Perfect Health, and Dr. Rhonda Love of the University of Toronto.
TBA	"Home Decorating"	13 September 1990	14 September 1990	02-xxx
Featuring publisher Lynda Colville-Reeves, contractor David Bermann, and hairdresser Paul King.
TBA	"Jeanne Cooper: The Young and the Restless"	14 September 1990	TBA	02-xxx
Featuring actor Jeanne Cooper ("Katherine Chancellor"); casting agent Brian Levy of Levy Comerford Casting and actor Lee Anne Simms.
TBA	"Cooking"	18 September 1990	TBA	02-xxx
Featuring culinary expert Bonnie Stern and Jean Pare of Company's Coming cookbooks.
TBA	"Parents Mistakes"	18 September 1990	19 September 1990	02-xxx
Featuring Bonnie Stern; Claudette Wassil-Grimm, author of How to Avoid Your Parents' Mistakes, and psychologist Dr. Cathy Gildiner.
TBA	"Developing Psychic Ability"	19 September 1990	TBA	02-xxx
Featuring Litany Burns, author of Develop Your Psychic Abilities.
TBA	"Candida and PMS"	20 September 1990	TBA	02-xxx
Featuring immune system specialist Dr. Carolyn Dean, nutritional consultant Jeff Levin; Dr. Bernard Rimland, Director of the Autism Research Institute and Barbara Boucher.
TBA	"Radiation"	21 September 1990	24 September 1990	02-xxx
Featuring Louis Slesin of Microwave News, Frank Bradley of the Canadian Electrical Association, Dr. Rosalie Bertell author of No Immeidate Danger: Prognosis for a Radioactive Earth and nuclear physicist Dr. Kenneth McNeill.
TBA	"Baby Blues"	24 September 1990	25 September 1990	02-xxx
Featuring pediatrician Dr. Diane Sacks, Sharon Crowe, mother of twins Jacquie Bynon and chiropractor Mary Ann Goldhawk.
TBA	"Men's Life Magazine"	TBA	26 September 1990	02-xxx
Featuring Bob Berkowitz, senior editor of Men's Life magazine; CHFI-FM radio show host Don Daynard; indy racecar driver Scott Goodyear; men's expert Dr. Michael Kaufman and actor Art Hindle of E.N.G.
TBA	"Megatrends"	26 September 1990	27 September 1990	02-xxx
Featuring John Naisbitt, author of Megatrends 2000 and Max Dublin, author of Futurehype: The Tyranny of Prophecy.
TBA	"Kitchens"	27 September 1990	28 September 1990	02-xxx
Featuring publisher Lynda Colville-Reeves; contractor Stephen Bailey; Frank Corrado of Ferretti Kitchens, Sandra Harmer of Kitchensmyth Design Ltd. and Steve Brannan of Brannan's Appliance Repair.
TBA	"Gay Ministers"	28 September 1990	1 October 1990	02-xxx
Featuring Rev. Eilert Frerichs, Rev. Sally Boyle, Rev. Gordon Ross, ex-director of Community of Concern, Dr. John Trueman of the United Church of Canada's Community of Concern, Rev. Dr. Walter Farquharson of the United Church of Canada, Rev. Brent Hawkes and Michael Riordon, author of The First Stone: Homosexuality and the United Church.
TBA	"To Eat Meat or Not to Eat Meat"	3 October 1990	4 October 1990	02-xxx
Featuring Dr. Michael Klapper of Earthsave; Geoffrey Giuliano, an ex-Ronald McDonald; Dr. Ronald Ball of the Wholesome Food Council of Canada; Dr. Gordon Surgeoner, a medical veterinary entomologist; and Margaret Thibealt of the Beef Information Centre.
TBA	"Dreams"	1 October 1990	2 October 1990	02-xxx
Featuring dream analyst Dr. Kathy Belicki and researcher Comrie Cleland.
TBA	"Caring for Disabled Children"	2 October 1990	3 October 1990	02-xxx
Featuring Brendan Turner, Joanie Turner, Jim Stone and Nancy Stone, president of the Ontario Association of Community Living, Stephanie Johnson, Linda Johnson-McLean, Nancy Christie of the Canadian Rehabilitation Council for the Disabled, fashion student Maria Hinds and Social Services consultant Craig Shields.
TBA	"Fashion"	3 October 1990	5 October 1990	02-xxx
Featuring image consultant John MacKay, fashion designer Franco Mirabelli, sportswear buyer Sheila Lende.
TBA	"Catalogue Craze"	TBA	10 October 1990	02-xxx
Featuring Marcello Venafro of Hedonics, Penny Rawlings of Arctic Trading Company, Barbara Canning Brown of the Canadian Catalogue Council, Deborah Goodwin of Side-tracked Home Executives, Gaylord Lindal of Viceroy Homes and Jennifer Deacon of Bridgehead/OXFAM.
TBA	"Life After the Series"	5 October 1990	8 October 1990	02-xxx
Featuring Nichelle Nichols (Uhura of Star Trek), and Juliet Mills of Nanny and the Professor.
TBA	"Breast Cancer"	9 October 1990	9 October 1990	02-xxx
Featuring Christine Garment, Dr. Bonnie Madonic, Nancy Goodman Brinker, surgeon Dr. Susan Love, Mary Patterson, Pierette Stinson, Dr. Roy Clark, Raylene Godel, plastic surgeon Dr. J. Michael Drever and specialist Dr. Richard Hasselback.
TBA	"The Power"	10 October 1990	11 October 1990	02-xxx
Featuring James Mill, author of the novel The Power and Philip Beuchler, a spiritual warfare expert.
TBA	"Home Decorating"	12 October 1990	TBA	02-xxx
Featuring publisher Lynda Colville-Reeves, Mary Wood of The Rent Report, tenants Kim Thompson, Joe Day and Ron Kostka.
TBA	"Cooking with Apples"	11 October 1990	12 October 1990	02-xxx
Featuring cooking expert Bonnie Stern, and Norm Matheson, historical interpreter from Black Creek Pioneer Village.
TBA	"Beauty, Brains and Bucks"	12 October 1990	TBA	02-xxx
Featuring Bonnie Bickle of B.B. Bargoon's, Vickie Kerr of Miss Vickie's Chips, Paige Silcox of Cookie-It-Up, Bridgette Manning of Colours and Dr. Monica Belfour of York University.
TBA	"Life Gifts Transplants and Family Violence"	15 October 1990	15 October 1990	02-xxx
Filmed live on location in London, Ontario. Featuring Fred Cassell, Heather Fisher, Sally Galsworthy, Julie Osallo, Ike Bryldt author Dr. Calvin Stiller, Mike Bloch, senior transplant donor coordinator, Dr. Bill Brady chair of the Ethics Committee of London University Hospital, and Dr. Andrew Lzarovitz, organ transplant specialist.
TBA	"Surviving Losing Your Job"	15 October 1990	16 October 1990	02-xxx
Filmed in London Ontario. Featuring Pat Smith, Malcolm Wood, career counsellor Jan Gibson, financial commentator Brian Constello and employment lawyer Howard Levitt.
TBA	"Horror at Home"	17 October 1990	17 October 1990	02-xxx
Filmed live on location at the Hamilton Art Gallery. Featuring Tom Sutor, family psychologist Dr. Cathy Gildiner, Judy Rebick of the National Action Committee on the Status of Women, Trudy Don coordinator of the Ontario Association of Interval and Transition Houses, and Lillianne St-Denis.
TBA	"Antiques and Collectibles"	18 October 1990	18 October 1990	02-xxx
Filmed live on location in Kitchener at the Seagram Museum. Featuring Lynda Colville-Reeves, Jonny Kalisch, Donald Webster of the Royal Ontario Museum and collector Paul Bahmann.
TBA	"Sexism on Campus"	19 October 1990	19 October 1990	02-xxx
Filmed live on location in Kitchener. Featuring Nini Johns, a graduate of Queen's University; Elaine Miller, an engineering student from the University of Waterloo; Kevin Fair, President of the Engineering Society; Tim Costigan, member of the University of Toronto's student council; Stuart Lewis, president of the Wilfrid Laurier University Student Union; Lyndsay Dorney English, professor at the University of Waterloo; Honara Shaughnessy, Employment Equity Coordinator at McGill University; Peter Eglin, assistant professor of Sociology at Laurier University; Arthur Stephen, Director of Institutional Relations at Laurier; and psychologist Dr. Gerry Goldberg.
TBA	"Until Death Do Us Part"	22 October 1990	TBA	02-xxx
Featuring widow Peggy Gosling; Sheila Simpson, author of The Survivor's Guide: Coping with the Details of Death, Rod Ingram of the Ontario Board of Funeral Services; Julie Tubman, President of the Ontario Funeral Services Association; Bob McKinnon, author of The Simple Alternative; and lawyer Daniel Melamed.
TBA	"Fashion"	23 October 1990	24 October 1990	02-xxx
Featuring stylist John MacKay, Carol Colby, Madeleine Webster of Helix Fragrances and Martin Duff of Vidal Sasson Salon.
TBA	"Marine Life Massacre"	24 October 1990	TBA	02-xxx
Featuring Michael O'Sullivan of World Society for the Protection of Animals and Erich Hoyt, author of Seasons of the Whale.
TBA	"Winning at Parenting"	25 October 1990	TBA	02-xxx
Featuring Barbara Coloroso, author of Winning at Parenting.
TBA	"Hanging Up Your Habits"	25 October 1990	29 October 1990	02-xxx
Featuring Rita Patenaude, a nun for 37 years; Ann Copeland, a nun for 13 years; Aldona Ewazko of the Sisters of Charity of St. Louis and Barbara Coloroso, nun for 3 years.
TBA	"Vampires"	30 October 1990	31 October 1990	02-xxx
Featuring vampire Anne; Norine Dresser, author of American Vampires: Fans, Victims, Practitioners, Raymond T. McNally, author of Dracula: Prince of Many Faces; and David J. Skal, author of Hollywood Gothic: The Tangled Web of Dracula from Novel to Stage to Screen.
TBA	"The Beauty Myth"	31 October 1990	1 November 1990	02-xxx
Featuring model agents Judy Welsh and Jacqueline Hope‚ Naomi Wolf, author of The Beauty Myth; Katherine Gilday, director of The Famine Within; Joan Jacobs Brumberg, author of Fasting Girls: The Emergence of Anorexia Nervosa as a Modern Disease; and psychotherapist Karin Jasper.
TBA	"Bisexual Spouses"	1 November 1990	2 November 1990	02-xxx
Featuring Elora, Valerie, Melissa Millar and James Millar; and social worker/counsellor Caryn Millar.
TBA	"Hidden Agendas"	2 November 1990	12 November 1990	02-xxx
Featuring Dr. Marlin S. Potash, author of Hidden Agendas; journalist Arlen Bynon of CHFI Radio; journalist Chris Zelkovich of Toronto Star; freelance writer Johanna Reneay; and commentator Dick Symthe of CFTR Radio.
TBA	"A Taste of Quebec"	5 November 1990	5 November 1990	02-xxx
Filmed in Montreal. Featuring Bonnie Stern, Julian Armstrong of A Taste of Quebec; chef Gyslain Parent of Les Filles du Roy; Irwin and Rhonda Shlafman of Fairmount Bagels; and Martha Robinson of Duc de Lorraine Patisserie.
TBA	"Whose Land Is It Anyway?"	6 November 1990	6 November 1990	02-xxx
Filmed in Montreal featuring Joe Norton; George Erasmus, National Chief of the Assembly of First Nations; CTV reporter Dave Rinn; Jim Miller, author of History of Native-White Relations in Canada; and Matthew Coon Come, Grand Chief of the James Bay Cree.
TBA	"The Other Side of the Disque"	7 November 1990	7 November 1990	02-xxx
Filmed in Montreal featuring singers Jean Marc lead singer of The Box, Daniel Lavoie, Luba, and Jim Corcoran.
TBA	"Fashion"	8 November 1990	8 November 1990	02-xxx
Filmed in Montreal featuring stylist John MacKay, designer Jean-Claude Poitras, designer Francesco Naccarato, jeweler Howard Hamburg and Beverley Hamburg, Montreal Gazette columnist Tommy Schnurmacher and Veronica Redgrave of Redgrave Communications.
TBA	"Heart and Soul of Quebec"	9 November 1990	9 November 1990	02-xxx
Filmed in Montreal. Featuring children's film producer Rock Demers, singer/actress/writer Pauline Julien, cartoonist Terry Mosher and editor of Vise Versa Lamberto Tassinari.
TBA	"Street Proofing"	TBA	12 November 1990	02-xxx
Featuring police officer Mike, social worker Judi Shields, Lesley Parrott a creator of a street-proofing program, Richard Gossage author of "Parent's Guide to Street-proofing," Wally Slocki co-founder of "Superkids" and Rick Rogers an advisor on issues of sexual abuse.
TBA	"Mary Kay"	13 November 1990	14 November 1990	02-xxx
Featuring Mary Kay Ash of Mary Kay Cosmetics.
TBA	"The Royals"	14 November 1990	15 November 1990	02-xxx
Featuring Louise Lague of People Magazine, Andrew Morton, author of "Diana's Diary: An Intimate Portrait of the Princess of Wales," Anne Edwards author of "Royal Sisters: Queen Elizabeth II and Princess Margaret," Patricia Foster author of "The British Connection" and HSH Prince Hermann Friedrich of Leiningen.
TBA	"Royal Winter Fair"	TBA	16 November 1990	02-xxx
Filmed at the Royal Winter Fair at the C.N.E. Features director Doug McDonnell, manager of the Junior Barrow Show John Bancroft, farmer Jack Van Diepen, Minister of Agriculture for Ontario Hugh Martin, Nova Scotia show jumper Melanie Reid, Joy Chiperzak of Joywind Rare Breeds Farm, Kurt Christ of Weall Cullen Gardens and Harold Chopping of the Canadian Show Jumping Team.
TBA	"Simon Alexander"	15 November 1990	19 November 1990	02-xxx
Featuring psychic Simon Alexander.
TBA	"Home Decorating"	19 November 1990	21 November 1990	02-xxx
Featuring Lynda Colville Reeves publisher of House & Home Magazine, Sheila McGraw author of "Papier mache Today," and Lesley Cotton of Eaton's Department store.
TBA	"Comic Relief"	20 November 1990	22 November 1990	02-xxx
Featuring Bil Keane of "The Family Circus," Brian Basset of "Adam", Lynn Johnston of "For Better or For Worse," and Robb Armstrong of "Jump Start."
TBA	"Cosmetic Surgery"	22 November 1990	23 November 1990	02-xxx
Featuring plastic surgeon Dr. Sandy Prichard, patient Barbara Somerville, psychologist Rochelle Litman and patient Glenda Tambling.
TBA	"Gemini Stars"	26 November 1990	27 November 1990	02-xxx
Featuring Art Hindle of "E.N.G.", Kenneth Welsh of "Love and Hate," Stacie Mistysyn of "Degrassi High," C. David Johnson of "Street Legal," Maria Topalovicci, executive director and Al Waxman, chairman of the Academy of Canadian Cinema & Television.
TBA	"The Great Dinner"	27 November 1990	28 November 1990	02-xxx
Featuring culinary expert Bonnie Stern, editor of "Canadian Living Entertainment Cookbook" Carol Ferguson, Christophe LeChatton, maitre d' at the Four Seasons Hotel, wine connoisseur Tony Aspler and Allison Cumming of Allison Cumming Gourmet Catering.
TBA	"Dini Goes to the Dogs"	29 November 1990	TBA	02-xxx
Featuring Howard Clark and "Digger" of Agriculture Canada, animal actor trainer Jane Conway, dog trainer Marti McCann, dog breeder Toni Lett, veterinarian John Reeve-Newson, and Jesse Collins star of "Katts and Dog."
TBA	"Diabetes"	30 November 1990	TBA	02-xxx
Featuring: Adrian Marples, a triathlete with diabetes; specialist Dr. Gerald Wong; radio host Sandy Hoty; Peter Oliver whose daughter has diabetes; and Catha McMaster author of "More Choice: The Diabetes Microwave Cookbook."
TBA	"Weekend Parents"	2 December 1990	TBA	TBA
Featuring author Carolyn Pogue author of "The Weekend Parent," Rob Johnston founder of "Family Ties," lawyer Richard Gaasenbeek, Laurie Coulter author of "Two Homes," and family court judge Justice Patricia Wallace.
TBA	"Strip King of Canada"	2 December 1990	TBA	02-xxx
Featuring strippers Mark Anthony, Joey Montana, Thomas Greco, Steve Dufour and Le Marquiss.
TBA	"An Old Fashioned Xmas"	23 November 1990	3 December 1990	TBA
Featuring psychologist Peter McGugan, Elizabeth Morley and David Morley authors of "Under the Tree: Creative Alternatives to a Consumer Christmas," and video reviewer for CFTO News Robin Ward.
TBA	"From Bush Pilots to Wheat Circles"	3 December 1990	4 December 1990	02-xxx
Filmed in Winnipeg. Featuring bush pilot Hugh Smith, Jim Campbell of Campbell Air, farmers Joe Thomusschewsky and Don Johnson, wheat circle investigator Grant Cameron, Mr. K-Tel Phil Kives, historian Barry McCarton, mayor of Churchill Doug Webber and Brenda Birks of the Manitoba Museum of Man and Nature.
TBA	"Pornography"	5 December 1990	5 December 1990	02-xxx
Filmed in Winnipeg. Featuring: concerned parent Dr. Craig Campbell; owner of an Xrated video store Randy Jorgensen; Carolyn Keith, president of a group against pornography; pornography researcher Dr. James V.P. Check; Alan Borovoy of the Canadian Civil Liberties Association; Dr. Ehor Boyanowsky, associate professor of Criminology at Simon Fraser University; and "Bob" a registered sex offender.
TBA	"Home Decorating"	6 December 1990	6 December 1990	02-xxx
Filmed in Winnipeg. Featuring Lynda Colville Reeves, interior decorator Grant Marshall, architect/designers Marcia Sector and Lloyd Sector, and Barry Greenberg of Madison Del.
TBA	"Runaways"	7 December 1990	7 December 1990	02-xxx
Filmed in Winnipeg. Featuring Debbie Reynolds of the Elizabeth Fry Society, sex worker "Raven," mother of murdered woman Lynn Karpetz, Keith Cooper of Children's Home in Winnipeg, Riva Harrison of the Winnipeg Sun and Bruce Hardy of the North East Winnipeg Family and Child Services.
TBA	"Chanel/Living on $16,000 a year/Freed Hostages"	9 December 1990	10 December 1990	02-xxx
Featuring Bob Beck a released hostage, son Nicholas Beck and wife Merebeth Beck, Axel Madsen, author of "Chanel: A Woman of her Own," Heather Westendorp, author of "How to Live on $16,000 a Year."
TBA	"Santa School/Medical-Sugar/Food Banks"	TBA	11 December 1990	02-xxx
Featuring nutritional consultant Dr. Carolyn Dean, single mom Haedy Mason, Gerald Kennedy of the Daily Bread Food Bank, Richard Yampolsky of Foodshare and Santa Clause
TBA	"Home Decorating/Alcohol Advertising/Calendar Men"	12 December 1990	13 December 1990	02-xxx
Featuring publisher Lynda Colville Reeves, Dr. Michael Goodstart director of Health and Promotions Addiction Research Foundation, Karl Burden executive director of Concerns Canada, Hugh Segal vice-chairman of the Institute of Advertising, Sandy Morrison President of the Brewer's Association of Canada and Anthony C. Allen 1990 Calendar Man.
TBA	"Parents/Gifts/Addicts"	15 December 1990	17 December 1990	02-xxx
Featuring school psychologist Dr. Ester Cole, teacher Sue Mcmurty, Grade 6 student Carolyne Greene, Antonio a recovering addict, and Peter Appleton, author of "Billion Dollar High."
292	"Psychic/Retail Slump/Lupus"	17 December 1990	18 December 1990	02-xxx
Featuring psychic and palmist Anthony Carr prognosticating about the future, business critic Jerry White, Honey Agar, founder of the Lupus Association, Dr. Barbara Walz-LeBlanc of the Lupus Clinic at Wellesley Hospital.
TBA	"David Suzuki"	TBA	19 December 1990	02-xxx
Featuring David Suzuki, Minister of the Environment Robert de Cotret, the television program "It's a Matter of Survival," and Raffi's "Evergreen Everblue."
TBA	"Clio Awards/Home Decorating/Anger"	TBA	20 December 1990	02-xxx
Featuring Nancy Ross vice president of the Clio Awards, anger specialist John Musgrave, editor Lynda Colville Reeves of Canadian House and Home.
TBA	"XMas Overseas/Fashion/Collier Quints"	19 December 1990	20 December 1990	02-xxx
Featuring Brenda Benedict, Deb Welna, Darlene Deschenes whose husbands are on active duty in the Persian Gulf, hair dresser Bill Angst, fashion expert John MacKay and Mae Collier, mother of quintuplets.
TBA	"Movie Critic Show"	23 December 1990	26 December 1990	02-xxx
Featuring critic Brian D. Johnson of Maclean's Magazine, Ron Base, Michael Proudfoot, Christine Keeling, critic Michael Rechtshaffen of CHFI-FM, and Patrick Palmer producer of "Mermaids."
TBA	"Cooking/Distress/Writing"	26 December 1990	27 December 1990	02-xxx
Featuring Bonnie Stern, master graphoanalyst Elaine Charal, and Rev. Gordon Winch, executive director of the Distress Centre.
TBA	"Motivational Speaking"	30 November 1990	27 December 1990	02-xxx
Featuring motivational speaker Lee Milteer.
TBA	"The Stars of E.N.G."	2 December 1990	4 January 1991	02-xxx
Featuring Art Hindle (Mike Fennell), Sara Botsford (Ann Hildebrandt), Jim Millington (Seth Miller), Cynthia Bellinveau (Terry Morgan), Mary Beth Rubens (Booby Katz), Sherry Miller (Jane Oliver), Karl Pruner (Dan Watson), Mark Humphrey (Jake Antonelli) and Niel Dainard (J.C. Callahan).
TBA	"Travelling Alone/Meg Ruffman/Parenting"	2 January 1991	7 January 1991	02-xxx
Featuring actor Meg Ruffman and sexual assault survivor Anne Marie Wicksted.
TBA	"Children of Glasnost/Fitness/That Girl"	TBA	8 January 1991	02-xxx
Featuring Desmond Atholl, author of "That Girl and Phil," Globe & Mail society columnist Rosemary Sexton, Landon Pearson author of "Children of Glasnost," fitness consultant Bill Pearl.
TBA	"Obstacle/Contraceptives/Michelle Wright"	TBA	9 January 1991	TBA
Featuring Gerry Robert, author of "Conquering Life's Obstacles," Dr. Marion Powell of Planned Parenthood Toronto, Dr. Philip Darney of UCSF, Norplant user Mary Stapleton and country singer Michelle Wright.
TBA	TBA	TBA	10 January 1991	TBA
Featuring Bob Schwartz, author of "Diets Still Don't Work," Pat Abbott of Protect Yourself Magazine, female athlete of the year Helen Kelesi, and her father and trainer Milan Kelesi.
TBA	"Friends with Your Ex/C. Francis"	TBA	11 January 1991	TBA
Featuring Charlie Francis, Ben Johnson's ex-coach, Micki Moore and John Ralston Findlay who are friends with their exes, psychotherapist Dr. Janet Dowsling, and culinary expert Bonnie Stern.
TBA	"Celebrity Ski Gala / Ali MacGraw"	13 January 1991	14 January 1991	TBA
Filmed in Banff. Featuring Anthony Rufus Isaacs Tony Fitzjohn and Kim Ellis of the George Adamson African Wildlife Preservation Trust, Dr. Peter Polyango the Ambassador to Tanzania, Olympic decathlon winner Bruce Jenner, Dana Ashbrook of "Twin Peaks," Michael Nader of "Dynasty", singer/songwriter Kim Carnes, actors Bruce Boxleitner, Chris Lemmon and Carl Weathers.
TBA	"Chris Everet/Mountain Climbers/Ski Wear/Cooking"	14 January 1991	15 January 1991	TBA
Filmed in Banff. Featuring tennis pro Chris Evert, Olympic skier Amy Mill, mountain climbers John Amatt and Sharon Wood, fashion editor Bernice Huxtable of the Calgary Herald.
TBA	"Jane Seymour/Home Decorating/Ned Beatty"	TBA	16 January 1991	TBA
Filmed in Banff. Featuring actors Jane Seymour and Ned Beatty and Lynda Colville Reeves.
TBA	"Lorenzo Lamas/Winter Depression/Crazy Canucks"	TBA	17 January 1991	TBA
Filmed in Banff. Featuring Crazy Canucks Jim Hunter, Dave Irwin, and Ken Read, Donny McQuaid of Masters Skiing, Dr. Henry Jansen and Dr. Carl Bashko authors of "That's Living," and actor Lorenzo Lamas.
TBA	"Disabled Skiers/Robin Leach/Banff Park Travel"	TBA	18 January 1991	TBA
Filmed in Banff. Featuring Robin Leach of "Lifestyles of the Rich & Famous," disabled skier Chris Kock and his father Bruce Koch, blind siier John Houston, Earl Olson of the Canadian Association for Disabled Skiing, Dave Day of Banff National Park and travel writer and broadcaster Alex Burden.
TBA	"US Magazine/Moving Forward/Kids and War"	18 January 1991	21 January 1991	TBA
Featuring Jenna Kassam and her mother Nimi, child psychologist for the Toronto Board of Education Ester Cole, Bob Hofler executive editor of US Magazine, Deborah Goodwin of Sidetracked Home Executives.
TBA	"Best Medicine/Name Game/Psychologist"	21 January 1991	22 January 1991	TBA
Featuring Dr. Albert Mehrabian author of "The Name Game," psychologists Dr. Caterine Yarrow and Dr. Carlo Vigna, Joe Graedon author of "Best Medicine: Herbal Remedies to High-tech Rx Breakthroughs"
TBA	"Light His/Her Fire/Terrorism/Fashion"	22 January 1991	23 January 1991	TBA
Featuring John Tompson managing director of the Mackenzie Institute, Ellen Kriedman author of "Light Her Fire," fashion expert John MacKay.
TBA	"Light His/Her Fire/Ma Bell/Elder Abuse"	23 January 1991	24 January 1991	TBA
Featuring Carole Gault ("Ma Bell"), voice actor John Stocker, jingle singer and actor Cal Dodd, clinical nurse specialist Dalia Smelters, Rhoda Finnerson Chairpreson for Elder Abuse and Crime Association, Elizabeth Podnieks of Ryerson School of Nursing, Ellen Kridman author of "Light Her Fire."
TBA	"Etiquette in the 90s/Home Decorating/Rabbi Kushner"	TBA	25 January 1991	TBA
Featuring Lynda Colville-Reeves, interior designer Christine Haines, Rabbi Kushner author of "When All You Ever Wanted Isn't Enough," and etiquette expert Shannon Smith.
TBA	"Cooking with Bonnie Stern/The Miracle Doctor/Canadian Ski Team"	26 January 1991	28 January 1991	TBA
Featuring culinary expert Bonnie Stern, Dr. Richard Heinzl of Doctors Without Borders Canada, Richard Pierce, Craig Young and Tanya Clarke of the Canadian Freestyle Ski Team.
TBA	"Yuk Yuks/Fashion/Cliff Richards"	TBA	29 January 1991	TBA
Featuring comics Mark Breslin, Sherry O'Brien, Jeremy Hotz, fashion consultant John MacKay, hair stylist Bill Angst, makeup artist Barbara Alexander, singer Cliff Richards.
TBA	"Browned Off/Eczema/Sex on the Set"	28 January 1991	30 January 1991	TBA
Featuring Earl Best who wants to be a Brownie leader, Joan Howell of the Girl Guides of Canada, Michael Rechshaffen entertainment editor of CHFI Radio, Dr. Bernice Krafchik of the University of Toronto.
TBA	"Saddam Hussein/Home Decorating/Baby Faces"	TBA	31 January 1991	TBA
Featuring Laurie Mylroie author of "Saddam Hussein and the Crisis in the Gulf," Lynda Colville-Reeves of Canadian House & Home, Profesor Avi Freidman of McGill University, editor Mike Burke-Gaffney of the Sunday Sun, David Hensley, Anna Marie Dubyk, and Liz Mann of the Baby Face Agency and models Kaura Anne and Danielle, Eric Sage who starred in a Huggies Commercial.
TBA	"Autistic/Zaslow/G.S.T."	31 January 1991	2 January 1991	TBA
Featuring advice columnist Jeffrey Zaslow, GST protestors Carl Sinding, Etienne Kerr, tax lawyer Paul Dioguardi, Joanne Schnurr of CJOH Ottawa, financial expert Jerry White, Annabel Stehli author of "Sound of a Miracle," and Georgie "cured" of Autism.
TBA	"Entrepreneurs/Computers/Rape"	Featuring survivor Sandie Bellows DeWolfe, entrepreneurs Megan Currie, Wendy Bordnman, Ranjit Dhaliwal, Stuart Johnson, humon calculator Scott Flansburg.	4 February 1991	TBA
TBA	"Empower Yourself/Vincent Bugloisi/Fashion"	TBA	5 February 1991	TBA
Featuring Elaine Dembe, David Gershon, author of "Empowerment," fashion consultant John MacKay, Vincent Bugloisi author of "And the Sea Will Tell."
TBA	"Families/Eye Surgery/Astrology"	TBA	6 February 1991	TBA
Featuring Helene Tremblay author of "Families of the World," Dr. Joseph Weinstock professor of Ophthalmology, patient Sanda Sevigny, Dr. Marvin Kwitko of the Department of Health and Welfare, patient Karina Schaak and astrology Byron Barwick.
TBA	"Science Matters/Shopping for a Friend/Home Decorating"	TBA	7 February 1991	TBA
Featuring James Trefil author of "Science Matters," Lynda Colville-Reeves, interior decorator Arthur Lewis, Alice Tepper Marlin of "Shopping for a Better World."
TBA	"Bikers/Bartering/Abortion"	7 February 1991	8 February 1991	TBA
Featuring biker Ralph, motor maid Marlene Graham, biker Lino Zecca, Danny Perkins of B.A.D.D., barter system user Bob Bale, David Pedwell of Tradesource Inc., Mayor Fran Sainsbury of the Town of Whitechurch-Stouffville, writer Lindalee Tracey.
TBA	"Entertain/Happy/Grainger"	10 February 1991	11 February 1991	TBA
Featuring children's entertainers Sandra Beech, Susan Hammond, children's author Kathy Stinson, Sandy Goddard founder of "Women of the Workplace," and actor Peter Barton ("Scott Grainger" of The Young of the Restless).
TBA	"Winter Blahs/Death of a Child/Fashion"	TBA	12 February 1991	TBA
Featuring Paul Goldstein (lost child to car accident), Jane Monro (son died of meningitis), psychotherapist David Wright, fashion consultant John MacKay, and Nancy Taylor of The Body Shop.
TBA	"Gossip/Breast Image/Supermarket Shopper"	12 February 1991	13 February 1991	TBA
Featuring lifestyle expert Micki Moore, Susan Malseed, Mary Matthews, consumer columnist Martin Sloane, Toronto Society columnist Rosemary Sexton, Valerie Gibson Vancouver gossip columnist.
TBA	"Strip for Your Lover/Cooking/Singles Unite"	13 February 1991	14 February 1991	TBA
Featuring Madame Zeina and stripper Thomas Greco, writer Wendy Dennis, culinary expert Bonnie Stern, dating consultant Andrea Reynolds.
TBA	"Dress for Attention/Home Decorating/Raymond Moody"	14 February 1991	15 February 1991	TBA
Featuring flamboyant dressers Sergion Bebarros, Hans Van Boven, Jessica Johnson, Anita Gorecky, editor Lynda Colville-Reeves, Brent Hackett of Provincial Wallcovering Ltd., Michael Rechtshaffen entertainment editor at CHFI.
TBA	"True Love/Gilbert Gottfried/Dr. Morton Shulman"	17 February 1991	18 February 1991	TBA
Featuring comedian Gilbert Gottfried, Dr. Morton Shulman who suffers from Parkinsons and relationship expert Daphne Rose Kingma.
TBA	"Impersonators/100 Years"	18 February 1991	19 February 1991	TBA
Featuring impersonators Mark McAllister (George Michael), Tony McKay (Prince), Angelina Leraci (Janet Jackson), Paul Scarponi (Rod Stewart), and longevity expert Dr. Walter M. Bortz.
TBA	"Cross Dresser/Fashion/Workaholics"	19 February 1991	20 February 1991	TBA
Featuring cross-dressers Alison, Krista, Penny (who trains drag queens), Dr. Paul Fedoroff, workaholic Rick Gulliver, Dr. Barbara Killinger author of "Workaholics: the Respectable Addicts," fashion consultant John MacKay and fashion journalist June Weir.
TBA	"Royal Gossip/Home Decorating/Animal Relief in Gulf"	20 February 1991	21 February 1991	TBA
Featuring gossip columnist Richard Mineards of the London Daily Express, John Walsh the assistant director general of the WSPA, Michael O'Sullivan of the WSPA, and Caroline Jonas of Steptoe and Wife Antiques.
TBA	"Road Fever/Passive Bystanders/Consumer"	21 February 1991	22 February 1991	TBA
Featuring Cathy Ellis who saved a child from parental abuse, Inspector Mike Sale of TPS, Stephen Lopez who saved a woman on the subway, Pat Abbott author of "Protect Yourself" and endurance driver Garry Sowerby.
TBA	"Jim and Tammy Bakker/Summer Holidays"	24 February 1991	25 February 1991	TBA
Featuring Charles E. Shepard author of "Forgiven", culinary expert Bonnie Stern, consumer consultant Faye Clark of the Ontario Tender Fruit Institute, Dan Patterson studying yearround at the Muskoka School Board, Monica Kcawetz studying yearround at the Durham School Board.
TBA	"Fashion/Therapist/Theatre"	TBA	26 February 1991	TBA
Featuring fashion consultant John MacKay, fashion reporter Bernadette Morra, Denis Bouchard of M.A.C. Bouchard Hair, Jeri Wine, abused by her therapist, feminist therapist and researcher Temi Firsten, lawyer Marilou McPhedran, theatrical producer Tina Vanderheyden, and Professor Monica Belcourt of York University.
TBA	"Tony Curtis/Environmental Health"	TBA	27 February 1991	TBA
Featuring actor and artist Tony Curtis and respiratory specialist Dr. Susan Tarlo.
TBA	TBA	27 February 1991	28 February 1991	TBA
Featuring actor/activist Margo Kidder, editor Lynda Colville-Reeves, Reenie Keeley of Hand-painted Furniture, Shannon Smith of Premier Image Inc.
TBA	"UFO Convention/Dyslexia/Richard Oliver"	28 February 1991	1 March 1991	TBA
Featuring Richard Oliver.
TBA	"Stan's Band/Barbara Colorosa/Dangerous Dream"	TBA	1 March 1991	TBA
Featuring pub band "Seatbelts for Dogs," Barbara Colorosa author of "Winning at Parenting," and dream expert Dr. Kathy Belicki.
TBA	"Recession/Boredom Institute/Alcoholic Parents"	1 March 1991	4 March 1991	TBA
Featuring psychologist Dr. Kathy Gildner, adult children of alcoholic parents Brenda and Colin, Alan Caruba President of the "Boring Institute", Kay and Jan Kristiansen of Recession Magazine.
TBA	"Incest/Jerry Baker/Simon Alexander"	TBA	5 March 1991	TBA
Featuring psychologist Dr. Kathy Gildner, incest survivors Sylvia Fraser and Ken Hood, master gardener Jerry Baker and psychic Simon Alexander.
TBA	"Investors/Headaches/Childhood Scars"	TBA	6 March 1991	TBA
Featuring Dr. Shelly Beauchamp of the Women Inventors Project; Bev McMullen inventor of "The Wave Bar", Bob Dubeck inventor of "Leisure Reader", Diane Riche inventor of "invisible Planter", Sandy Alfard inventor of Alexandria Body Sugar, Violet Mason inventor of Spool Organizer, Brian Gray of The NEw Product Story, nutritional specialist Dr. Carolyn Dean, psychologist Dr. Cathy Gildiner, Mary Mach and Clare Burns.
TBA	"Belly Dancing/Religion/Home Decorating"	TBA	8 March 1991	TBA
Featuring editor Lynda Colville-Reeves, design consultant Philip Moody, psychologist Dr. Cathy Culdiner, Dorothy Clippingdate who rebelled against religious upbringing, Eddy Manneh of Freddy's Dance Academy.
TBA	"Happiness/Food and Gut Reaction/Jeff and Tess"	10 March 1991	11 March 1991	TBA
Featuring Elaine Gottschall (author of "Food and the Gut Reaction"); Tessa Evason and Jeff Evason (mind readers) and Dr. Alex Michalos (University of Guelph)
TBA	"Self Defense/Franchising/Puppets"	11 March 1991	12 March 1991	TBA
Featuring self defense expert Debbie Gardner, financial expert Jerry White, franchise lawyer Frank Zaid, puppeteers Peter Baird and Dan Redican.
TBA	"Fashion/Midwives/Paris Black"	TBA	13 March 1991	TBA
Featuring fashion consultant John MacKay, Jeffrey Wortsman (Danier Leather), designer Roger Edwards, Carol Good, midwife Robin Kilpatrick, Dr. Karyn Kaufman (Coordinator for Midwifery for Government of Ontario's Ministry of Health), singer Paris Black and ISBA record agent Steve Sechi.
TBA	"Michael Korda/Electroshock/Home decorating"	13 March 1991	14 March 1991	TBA
Featuring author Michael Korda ("Curtain"), psychologist Dr. Norman Endler and Marg Oswin (received electroshock therapy), Dr. Joel Jeffries and Dr. Bonnie Burstow, and Suzanne Bartsch (Vanity Fair).
TBA	"Brendan Grace/Irish Comic/1 Hour Orgasm"	14 March 1991	15 March 1991	TBA
Featuring comedian Brendan Grace; Bob Schwartz, author of "The One-Hour Orgasm," image consultant Judi Argue, hairdresser Bill Angst and makeup artist Carol Davidson.
TBA	"[No title]"	18 March 1991	TBA	TBA
Featuring animal casting agent Len Brook, psychologist Dr. Laura Champion, course coordinator Mary-Lou Bingham, Ann Daniels (teaches sibling rivalry class), Sally Spencer, Executive Director of "Youth Assisting Youth", volunteers Melanie Jones and Deryck Thomas and client Natalie.
TBA	"AIDS Update/Neon Rider/Transsexual"	18 March 1991	19 March 1991	TBA
Filmed in Canada Harbour Place, Vancouver. Featuring transsexual activist Angela Wensley, Winston Rekert of "Neon Rider", Patrick Olenick of the Foundation for Immune Diseases.
TBA	"Rita MacNeil/Sex Addicts/Viewer Mail"	14 March 1991	19 March 1991	TBA
Featuring singer Rita MacNeil, Patrick Carnes, author of "Don't Call It Love: Recovery from Sexual Addition," recovering sex addicts John and Fred.
TBA	"Dr. Tomorrow/Cooking/Michael Slade"	19 March 1991	20 March 1991	TBA
Filmed in Canada Place in Vancouver. Featuring Michael Slade, horror novelist Jay Clarke, executive chef Barnard Casavant of the Chateau Whistler Resort, Karen Neilson of the Market Kitchen Cooking school, Arden Narusevicieux, and futurist Frank Ogden ("Dr. Tomorrow").
TBA	"Gay Parents/Bills/Empathy"	TBA	21 March 1991	TBA
Featuring Kisten Trenholm, Karen Andrews, Rev. Eilert Ferichs, psychologist Dr. Maria Minicucci, financial consultant Marvin Zweig, actor Derek McGrath, inventory Linda Ware of "Empathy Belly."
TBA	"Colin James/Lefties/Epilepsy"	TBA	21 May 1991	TBA
Filmed in Canada Harbour Place, Vancouver. Featuring Colin James, Dr. Stanley Coren, Jacqueline of Lefty Products, epileptic Alison Lockwood and nueurosurgeon Dr. Gordon Thompson.
TBA	"Fashion"	TBA	22 March 1991	TBA
Featuring fashion consultant John Mackay, Harry Bendayan of Marc Laurent Men's Wear, Paul Bourne of Brogue Men's Wear, Rick Padulo of Padulo Advertising, master gardener Jerry Baker.
TBA	"Fashion/Cindy James/Richard Dickie"	TBA	22 March 1991	TBA
Filmed in Canada Harbour Place, Vancouver. Featuring Tilley Hack and Otto Hack, parents of Cindy Hack, Neal Hall of the Vancouver Sun, private investigator Ozzie Kaban, author Ian Mulgrew ("Who Killed Cindy James?"), senior investigator Wally Christensen, Richard Dickie, lawyer Brian Webster, fashion designer Feizal Virani and Judy Osborn of BRAVO Children's Wear.
TBA	"Home Decorating/Do Men Fear Strong Women?/Janis Joplin"	TBA	24 March 1991	TBA
Featuring Elaine Esienberg of "Buy the Yard," Leslie Harrington of Benjamin Moore, Maureen Guiliani of Concerns Canada, Jane Lupton ("Janis Joplin"), lifestyle expert Micki Moore, lawyer Phil Deswirek, men's rights activist Ross Virgin, writer Russell Smith.
TBA	"Margaret Kemper/Children with AIDS"	TBA	26 March 1991	TBA
Featuring Margaret Kemper, marine scientist Dr. Joe MacInnis, and Dr. Judith Wallerstein, author of "Second Chances:Men, Women and Children a Decade After Divorce."
TBA	"Bill Daily/Cooking/Adoption"	26 March 1991	27 March 1991	TBA
Featuring actor Bill Daily, culinary expert Bonnie Stern, and author Judith Schaffer ("How to Raise an Adopted Child.")
TBA	"Brian Orser/Fashion/Photography"	TBA	28 March 1991	TBA
Featuring Olympic figure skater Brian Orser, Jacqueline Foley of Sherway Gardens Shopping Centre; Selina Odgen and Mary Pat Armstrong (parents of disabled children), Heather Clark of Ronald McDonald Children's Charities, and photographers Greg Staats and Rick Zolkower.
TBA	"Melanie Mayron/Rick Kramer/Mae Moore/Gallon"	TBA	29 March 1991	TBA
Featuring Richard Kramer, Melanie Mayron (Melissa on "Thirtysomething"), Gary Gallon, president of the Environment Economics International and singer-songwriter Mae Moore.
TBA	"April Fool/Cancer/Fashion"	31 March 1991	1 April 1991	TBA
Filmed in Saskatoon featuring actors Michael Lamport and Kim Cayer, oncologist Dr. Maureen Trudeau, author Dr. Carolyn DeMarco ("Take Charge of Your Body"), fashion consultant John Mackay, hat designer Vicki Sather, and Karen Gingras (Lilliput hats).
TBA	"Computer Dating/Medicine Men/Shy Men"	1 April 1991	2 April 1991	TBA
Filmed at Western Development Museum, Saskatoon. Featuring Dr. Brian G. Gilmartin (author of "The Shy-man Syndrome"), medicine man James Daigneault, widower and farmer Mark Day, divorced farmer Fred Clements, bachelor farmer Dale Radies, and Marlene LaMontagne.
TBA	"Sherlock Holmes/Kids Medication"	3 April 1991	4 April 1991	TBA
Filmed at Western Development Museum, Saskatoon. Featuring Jackie Webber (author of "A Parent's Guide to Children's Medication"), William A. S. Sargeant and C. Alan Bradley (co-authors of "Ms. Holmes of Baker Street") and Patricia M. Gulak, mayor of Lloydminster (a city split by the provincial border).
TBA	"Jailed Marriage/Double Income/Touring Canada"	TBA	4 April 1991	TBA
Filmed at Western Development Museum, Saskatoon. Featuring Jim O'Sullivan prison warden of Saskatchewan Penitentiary, Judy Maleki, engaged to an imprisoned person, Sylvia Griffith of the John Howard Society, James Fox author of "Mass Murder", Lynne MacFarlane author of "Double Income Families: Money Management for the Working Couple", and David Dunbar of "The Outdoor Traveler's Guide to Canada."
TBA	"Wayne Turmel/Inside Out/Film Festival"	4 April 1991	5 April 1991	TBA
Filmed at Western Development Museum, Saskatoon. Featuring comedian Wayne Turmel, Reform Party leader Preston Manning, James Tyman author of "Inside Out" and Allan Bailey, chair of the Yorkton Short Film and Video Festival.
TBA	"Ali MacGraw/Home Decorating/Gorby's Girls"	8 April 1991	9 April 1991	TBA
Featuring Rob Carbone (who married a Gorby Girl), former Gorby Girl Diana Pesotchinskaia; immigration lawyer Carter Hoppe, actress and author Ali MacGraw, Lynda Colville-Reeves and textile designer Kaffe Fassett.
TBA	"Danny Kaye/Fashion/Suicide"	9 April 1991	10 April 1991	TBA
Featuring Danny Kaye, Kirk McMahon ("Shaking Like a Leaf: A Tribute to Danny Kaye"), suicide prevention counsellor Walter Cavalieri, fashion expert John MacKay and Donna Grober-Brettons.
TBA	"Teens Speak Out/Medical/Wine"	10 April 1991	11 April 1991	TBA
Featuring Catherine Murray of Decima Research, grade 9 students Sarah Hollenberg and Doah Wilson, East York Public Health Nurse Linda Shoett, grade 12 student Roby Myers, Dr. Mark Groenburg of Sick Children's Hospital, cancer survivors Katherine Van Dusen and Anthony Talarico, wine expert Andrew Sharp.
TBA	"Man Who Can't Swallow/Street Kids/Tame Yourself"	11 April 1991	12 April 1991	TBA
Featuring John Karastamatis a man who cannot swallow and his wife Marie Karastamatis, speech pathologist Frances Ezerzer, Marlene Webber of "Street Kids: The Tragedy of Canada's Runaways", zoo veterinarian Dr. Kay Mehren and Dan Matthews of People for the Ethical Treatment of Animals.
TBA	"Beyond Diets/Parental Addiction/Kurds"	14 April 1991	15 April 1991	TBA
Featuring Kurdish refugees Rebwar Shaban, Bahar Murad, Sherko Saleh; Deborah Gibson of the Canadian Red Cross; Brenda Holden who gave up dieting, Dr. Donna Ciliskon a dietician, Janet Cipryk whose child was abducted by her husband, Judy McDonald of Child Find Ontario.
TBA	"Cars/Sleeping Better/Seniors for Seniors"	16 April 1991	TBA	TBA
Featuring sleep specialist Dr. Jeffrey Lipsitz, shift nurse Cecelia Fulton, actor David Rusaw, Jim Kenzie of the Toronto Star's "Wheels" section, Alex Law of the Automobile Journalist Association, Peter Cooke of Seniors for Seniors, Adele Nicholson a senior's companion.
TBA	"Murray McLauchlan/Cooking with Bonnie Stern/Roy Bonisteel"	TBA	17 April 1991	TBA
Featuring journalist Roy Bonisteel author of "There Was A Time", singer songwriter Murray McLauchlan, chef Mark McEwan and culinary expert Bonnie Stern.
TBA	"Rick Hansen/Lazarus and the Hurricanes/Ann B. Davis"	TBA	18 April 1991	TBA
Featuring athlete Rick Hansen, wheelchair basketball players Tracy Ferguson and Jeremy; Sam Chaiton and Terry Swinton, co-authors of "Lazarus and the Hurricane," Rubin "Hurricane" Carter, and actress Ann B. Davis.
TBA	"Dirk Benedict/Wendy Crawford/Home Decorating"	TBA	19 April 1991	TBA
Featuring actor and author Dirk Benedict, designer Wendy Crawford, designer Jean Charles-Bourgeois, Lynda Colville-Reeves of Canadian House & Home and Laurence Metrick of Elite Carpets Ltd.
TBA	"Robert Munsch/Love Sick/Saul Rubenick"	18 April 1991	22 April 1991	TBA
Featuring children's author Robert Munsch, Dr. Elizabeth MacAvoy, author of "Love Sick", Carolyn Third and Marie Legere (addicted to the wrong men) and actor Saul Rubenick.
TBA	"Liberty Silver/Lee Milteer/Hidden Establishment"	23 April 1991	24 April 1991	TBA
Featuring motivational speaker Lee Milteer, singer Liberty Silver, singer Molly Johnson, Brian Milner author of "The Hidden Establishment:The Inside Story of Canada's International Business Elite", Navin Chandaria, president of Conros Corporation, and Sarla Chandaria part of "the hidden establishment."
TBA	"Gordon Pinsent/Positive Parenting/Dr. Richard Leakey"	TBA	25 April 1991	TBA
Featuring Dr. Richard Leakey of the Kenya Wildlife Service, Barbara Burrows author of "Positive Parenting" and actor, writer, and director Gordon Pinsent.
TBA	"Wifebeaters/Irish Rovers"	TBA	25 April 1991?	TBA
Featuring Carl Narine, facilitator of therapy group for domestic abusers, Tom and Jim, "former wife beaters", Will Millar of The Irish Rovers, Kate Greer of "New Choices Magazine" and Bob and Dorothy Skakie, couple raising their grandchildren.
TBA	"Soap Gossip/Coronation Street/Hope for the Seriously Ill"	TBA	26 April 1991	TBA
Featuring actor Charles Lawson ("Jim McDonald" of Coronation Street), Lilana Novakovich, soap opera agent and promoter, counselling psychologist Dr. Ronna Fay Jevne.
TBA	"Fashion/Cancer-Bone Marrow/Ink Blots"	28 April 1991	29 April 1991	TBA
Featuring fashion consultatnt John MacKay, Deena Weinberg of Marina Rinaldi brand, ink blot specialist Dr. Wayne Holtzman, Mildred Bouckley and Ian Matsuura, bone marrow recipients, and Dr. Michael Baker of Toronto Hospital.
TBA	"Zappacosta/Little People/Jimmy Stewart"	29 April 1991	30 April 1991	TBA
Featuring singer songwriter Alfie Zappacosta; actor Jimmy Stewart; little persons Nathan Connor, Stephanie Brooks, Ruth Brouse, and Donny Brouse.
TBA	"Nylons/Teens/Gossip"	30 April 1991	1 May 1991	TBA
Featuring: Claude Morrison, Micah Barnes, Billy Newton-Davis, and Arnold Robinson of The Nylons; Jean Rook chief columnis of the London Daily Express and adolescent outreach worker Bernie Finnigan.
TBA	"Turtles/Gun Control/Home Decorating"	TBA	2 May 1991	TBA
Featuring: Kevin Eastman, co-creator of Teenage Mutant Ninja Turtles; Tony Cianciotto, vice president of Alliance Releasing; Liz Gross, licensing agent for the ninja turtles in Canada; politician John Reimer; Bill Rantyz of the National Firearms Association; Detective Superintendent Julian Fantino of the Metro Toronto Police; Wendy Cukier, Coordinator of Canadians for Gun Control; Lynda Colville-Reeves of Canadian House & Home; and Joel Marks of Beaver Lumber.
TBA	"Merrymen of Barbados/German Photos/Home Decorating"	2 May 1991	3 May 1991	TBA
Featuring Emile Straker, Chris Gibbs of The Merrymen; Marian Fowler, author of "Blenheim: Biography of a Palace; and Lynda Colville-Reeves of Canadian House & Home.
TBA	"Ethnic Beauty/Good Is/Crack Babies"	1 May 1991	7 May 1991	TBA
Featuring: Kerry Anderson of Perscriptives; Harriet Bruser (Maybelline); Jane McKay (MAC Cosmetics); Martin Duff (Vidal Sassoon); "high risk" nurse Marilyn Pearson; Christine Johnston of Children's Aid Society, Dick Dodds of East York Board of Education and advertising mogul Jerry Goodis (formerly of the Canadian folk-singing group the Travellers).
TBA	"Michael Rechtshaffen/Divorce Laws/Allergies"	1 May 1991	8 May 1991	TBA
Featuring: entertainment editor at CHFI Radio Michael Rechtshaffen; Marilyn Allen (daughter dies of allergic reaction); allergist Dr. Barry Zimmerman, author of "The Canadian Allergy and Asthma Handbook"; Pamela Spence (child with allergies and asthma); lawyer and author Michael Cochrane.
TBA	"Height of Romance/Holistic Debunking/Astrologer"	12 April 1991	9 May 1991	TBA
Featuring tall people seeking romance, including Kayte Petrunik, Mark Dimonte, Jay Stinson and John Tomlinson; lifestyle expert Micki Moore, Mike Pettapiece and Paul Benedetti reporters for The Hamilton Spectator, Patricia Wales president of the Ontario Naturopathic Association and astrologer Julie Simmons.
TBA	"I Am Elvis/Cooking/Tee-d Off"	29 April 1991	10 May 1991	TBA
Featuring Elvis impersonators Pat Dismine ("Elvis Little"), Douglas Roy, Sal Accaputo ("Selvis"); culinary expert Bonnie Stern; Linda Tickens who is challenging golf club's membership policy with lawyer Ernest Coetzee.
TBA	"Foot Book/Miracle Year/Mothers' Makeovers"	12 May 1991	13 May 1991	TBA
Featuring podiatrist and author Dr. Glen Copeland ("The Foot Book"), Lanie Carter, author of "The Miracle Year", Rae Butler, Melody Petty, Carol Ann DeCarlo Lindsay (Estee Lauder), Karen Bloom (Salon Femme); Wendy Portman (Wendy Portman's Fine Jewelry), Bill Angst (Angst Salon) and Jeffrey Shartzman of Danier Leather.
TBA	"Marc Cohn/Bouncing Back/Cooking"	TBA	15 May 1991	TBA
Featuring singer/songwriter Marc Cohn, chartered accountant Graham Cumingham; Steven Parker who started his own greeting card store, Ruth Greenwood who started her own wholesale business and culinary expert Bonnie Stern.
TBA	"Love Triangles/Fashion-Legs/Yad Vashem"	TBA	16 May 1991	TBA
Featuring Dr. Bonnie Jacobson, author of "Love Triangles," Linda Whitehead of Phantom Hosiery, Adrianne Gold of Town Shoes, Dr. Joel Dimitry, chairman of the Canadian Society for Yad Vashem and Miriam Gelbloom for the exhibit "A Day in the Warsaw Ghetto."
TBA	"White Light/Hearing Loss/Joy Fielding"	17 May 1991	TBA	TBA
Featuring cast of "White Light" including Allison Hossack, Martin Kove, Ron Base, and director Al Waxman; audiologist Tony Lofoux; Dennis Morrice of the Canadian Hearing Society and Joy Fielding author of "See Jane Run."
TBA	"Nancy White/Home Decorating"	20 May 1991	21 May 1991	TBA
Featuring Lynda Colville-Reeves of Canadian House & Home; homeowner Barbara Griffin, singer and satirist Nancy White and optician Keith Harrison.
TBA	"Love Obsessed/Doug Bennett/Molly Fox"	TBA	22 May 1991	TBA
Featuring Dr. Susan Forward, author of "Obsessive Love," stalking victim Carolyn Third; Doug Bennett of Doug and the Slugs and Molly Fox, author of "Step On It."
TBA	"Lynn McNamara/Understanding Men/Brian Bassett"	TBA	23 May 1991	TBA
Featuring John Eldredge of Focus on the Family, cartoonist Brian Basset of Adam, and entertainment writer Lynn McNamara.
TBA	"Mad at the Government/Green Gables/Dare to Live"	TBA	24 May 1991	TBA
Featuring angry trucker Bill Breckon, angry businessman Loudon Owen, Bill Gairdner, author of "Trouble with Canada," Carolyn Strom Collins and Christina Wyss Eriksson, authors of "The Anne of Green Gables Treasury"; and Mark Miller, author of "Dare To Live: A Guide to the Understanding and Prevention of Teenage Suicide and Depression."
TBA	"Dating Divorcees/Fastest Reader/I've Been Fired Too"	26 May 1991	27 May 1991	TBA
Featuring lifestyle expert Micki Moore, Charlotte Empey and Victor Hayes (who date divorced people); world's fastest runner Howard Berg and Ruthan Rosenberg and Jill Jukes co-authors of "I've Been Fired Too."
TBA	"Cooking/Veins/Columbus"	27 May 1991	28 May 1991	TBA
Featuring culinary expert Bonnie Stern, executive chef of the Four Seasons Hotel Susan Weaver; Dr. Deborah Smith of the Ontario Vein Clinic and plastic surgeon Dr. Earl Farber; Jim Hodgson of the Canadian Council of Churches and Alexander Rochari, a descendant of Christopher Columbus.
TBA	"Cheryl Cashman/Self Esteem/Census"	TBA	29 May 1991	TBA
Featuring actress and comdienne Cheryl Cashman; motivational expert Patricia Fripp; Linda Watt (angry at the National census) and Douglas Newson (a census organizer).
TBA	"Imposters/Agoraphobia/Telethon"	29 May 1991	30 May 1991	TBA
Featuring celebrity impersonators Christopher Peterson ("Marilyn Monroe"), Jackie Loren ("Cher"); J.J. Murray ("Dolly Parton"); Danny Love ("Bette Midler"); former agoraphobes Sandra Grant and Brian Campbell and psychologist Dr. Stephen Fleming; Liz Grogan host of Sick Children's telethon.
TBA	"Fashion/Sue Johanson/Endo"	TBA	31 May 1991	TBA
Featuring sex educator Sue Johanson, fashion expert John Mackay, obstetrician and gynecologist Dr. A. Albert Yuzpe and Barbara Mains of the Network for Endometriosis.
TBA	"Y&R Soap Stars"	TBA	3 June 1991?	TBA
Featuring Jess Walton, haircolour technician Simon Cupid and Weall and Cullen gardener Denis Flanagan.
TBA	"Kitty Dukakis/Sharon, Lois & Bram"	3 June 1991?	4 June 1991	TBA
Featuring Kitty Dukakis, author of "Now You Know"; Sharon Hampson, Lois Lilienstein and Bram Morrison of children's music group Sharon, Lois & Bram.
TBA	"John Bradshaw/Lisa Lougheed/Scott Goodyear"	4 June 1991	5 June 1991	TBA
Featuring John Bradshaw author of "Home Coming"; Indy car racer Scott Goodyear and singer/songwriter Lisa Lougheed.
TBA	"Grief and Loss/Home Decorating/Osteoporosis"	5 June 1991	6 June 1991	TBA
Featuring Lynda Reeves of Canadian House & Home; "Stylesearch" winners John Mink, Mardi Mink, Thomas Rosborough; Betty Jane Wylie, author of "New Beginnings: Living Through Loss and Grief"; Mary Hynes diagnosed with osteoporosis and Dr. Rick Adachi President of the Osteoporosis Society.
TBA	"Flesh for Fantasy/Fashion/Ben Wicks/Psychic"	6 June 1991	7 June 1991	TBA
Featuring Kim Ironmonger bridal designer for Valencienne; Mary Wright marketing director for Hazelton and Hayes; cartoonist and author Ben Wicks and author and teacher Susan Wicks; clairvoyant Barbara Quesnel.
TBA	"Pain Management/Carol Leifer/Cooking"	7 June 1991	10 June 1991	TBA
Featuring comedienne Carol Leifer; chronic pain sufferers Dianne Cahia, Bernadette Thompson and psychologist Dr. Carlo Vigna; culinary expert Bonnie Stern; teacher with York Montessori School Mary Ann Cianotti.
TBA	"Lynn Redgrave/Michael Jackson Book"	10 June 1991	11 June 1991	TBA
Featuring actress Lynn Redgrave and discussion of book by J. Randy Taraborrelli, Michael Jackson: The Magic and the Madness.
TBA	"Simon Alexander/Battered Women/Lawford-Marilyn Book"	11 June 1991	12 June 1991	TBA
Featuring Simon Alexander.
TBA	"Jackie Webber/"Chutzpah"/Mail"	12 June 1991	13 June 1991	TBA
TBA	"Brian Linehan/Sun Products/Contest Draw"	13 June 1991	14 June 1991	TBA
Featuring Brian Linehan.
