= The Dini Petty Show season 3 =

Listing of episodes of third season of Canadian daytime talk show, 1991-1992

The Dini Petty Show
- Season 3

Release
- Original network: CTV Television
- Original release: September 1991 – June 1992

Season chronology
- ← Previous; Season 2 (1990-1991) Next → Season 4 (1992-1993)

== Summary ==
Season three of The Dini Petty Show aired on CTV between September 1991 and June 1992. Season three consisted of over 200 hour-long episodes hosted by Petty, following the convention of having three segments per episode filmed in front of a live audience. The show sold tickets to live audience members, filming throughout the week at 1:00pm. Several episodes were filmed in Ottawa and Los Angeles. In addition to interviewing celebrities, politicians, medical experts, soap opera stars and authors, Petty also had regular features on home decorating, fashion, health and cooking which featured re-occurring guests, including decorator/publisher Lynda Colville-Reeves (of House & Home magazine), entertainment reporter Sam Rubin, culinary expert Bonnie Stern, entertainment writer Scott Seigel, and John MacKay, editor-in-chief of FASHION Magazine. In 1992, Dini Petty was nominated for a Gemini Award in the category of "Best Host in a Light Information, Variety or Performing Arts Program or Series."

== Episode list ==
No.	Title	Originally recorded	Original release date	Prod. code
TBA	TBA	30 September 1991	30 September 1991	03-001
Featuring: Crystal River, Florida fishermen Larry Meyers and Dennis Hampton who survived shark attacks while lost at sea; an interview with Priscilla DeVilliers (mother of Nina de Villiers who was murdered by Jonathan Yeo) discussing victims' rights; interview and performance by Byron Nease, "Raoul" in the Toronto production of "The Phantom of the Opera" including performances of Sondheim's "Take Me to the World" and "Being Alive."
TBA	"Slime/Marriage Question/Sally Struthers/Cosmetics-Paula Begoun"	2 October 1991	3 October 1991	03-002
Featuring interviews with "cosmetics cop" Paula Begoun and actor Sally Struthers.
TBA	"Tourette Syndrom/Treasure Hunt/Australian Hunks"	3 October 1991	4 October 1991	TBA
TBA	"Near Death/Marriage/Fashion"	4 October 1991	TBA	TBA
TBA	"Alfie and Veronique/Disable Beauty Contest Winnter/Cosmetic Surgery/"Pop Harp""	7 October 1991	8 October 1991	TBA
TBA	"Blue Jay Snacks/Fashion Knock Offs/ "He Should Have Died!""	8 October 1991	9 October 1991	TBA
TBA	"Parent Alienation/ Bernie Helgate/Sonny Bono"	20 July 1991	9 October 1991	TBA
Featuring Sonny Bono and Bernie Helgate.
TBA	"George Fox/James Doohan"	unknown	10 October 1991	TBA
Featuring interviews with actor James Doohan and country singer George Fox.
TBA	"Robin at the Movies/The Bold and the Beautiful/Sex after 60"	9 October 1991	10 October 1991	TBA
TBA	"Phyllis Newman/Tony Aspler Wine/Bold and the Beautiful"	9 October 1991	10 October 1991	TBA
Featuring interviews with actor Phyllis Newman and sommelier Tony Aspler.
TBA	"James Fox/Kelly Gruber/Fought Bears and Cougars"	10 October 1991	11 October 1991	TBA
TBA	"Jackson/Steiger/Woronov/Bourque"	11 October 1991	12 October 1991	TBA
Featuring guests: Paul Bourque, Latoya Jackson, Rod Steiger and Mary Woronov.
TBA	"McGavin/Stars/Magazine"	12 October 1991	13 October 1991	TBA
Featuring interviews with editor Michael Bate (Frank), Larry Horwitz, and actor Darren McGavin.
TBA	"Tyson's Alleged Assault/Women of the 90s/Romance Novels"	10 October 1991	14 October 1991	TBA
Featuring a segment on Mike Tyson's charge of rape.
TBA	"Miss Canada Reunion / Music Series: Lighthouse"	11 October 1991	15 October 1991	TBA
Featuring a performance by the band Lighthouse.
439	"With the Stampeders"	15 October 1991	16 October 1991	TBA
Featuring: an interview with Sylvia Panetta on the issue of provincial funding for home medical care, an interview with and performances by members of The Stampeders, and interview with author Dr. Winifred Cutler on her book "Love Cycles: The Science of Intimacy."
TBA	"Mackie/Popcorn"	13 October 1991	16 October 1991	TBA
Featuring an interview with fashion designer Bob Mackie.
TBA	"With Edward Bear"	16 October 1991	17 October 1991	TBA
Featuring musical performance by band Edward Bear.
TBA	"Never Fight with a Pig/Michelle Wright/Cut Off Her Breasts"	16 October 1991	17 October 1991	TBA
Featuring a performance by singer Michelle Wright.
TBA	"Grandma/Hunt/Falls"	17 October 1991	18 October 1991	TBA
Featuring an interview with actor Gareth Hunt.
TBA	"With Ian Thomas"	17 October 1991	18 October 1991	TBA
Featuring Jeff Hands, Jonathan Katz, Nia Peebles, with a musical performance by Ian Thomas.
TBA	"Barry Manilow/Tarzan and Jane/Simon McCorkindale"	18 October 1991	19 October 1991	TBA
Featuring interviews with singer Barry Manilow and actor Simon McCorkindale of the television series "Counterstrike".
TBA	"Lipizanner Horses/Acoster/Russel/Home Decorating"	19 October 1991	unknown	TBA
Featuring segments of a touring show featuring Lipizzan.
TBA	"Miss Canada/Abuse in the Church"	18 October 1991	21 October 1991	TBA
TBA	"Emily Fox/Gestures/Breasts"	TBA	22 October 1991	TBA
Featuring interview with Emily Fox.
TBA	"Alanis/Svend Robinson/Royal Gossip"	21 October 1991	22 October 1991	TBA
Filmed in Ottawa featuring an interview with politician Svend Robinson, singer Alanis Morissette, and a segment on royal gossip.
TBA	"Kreskin/Debbie Gardener/P.M. Wife"	20 October 1991	23 October 1991	TBA
TBA	"Hit by Lightning/Rankin Family/Elvis Lives!"	TBA	23 October 1991	TBA
Filmed in Ottawa featuring a musical performance by The Rankin Family.
TBA	"World's Strongest Boy/Elliott Gould/Cosby Kids"	TBA	24 October 1991	TBA
Featuring an interview with actor Elliott Gould.
TBA	"Carolyn Waldo/Judy Croon"	23 October 1991	24 October 1991	TBA
Filmed in Ottawa featuring interviews olympian Carolyn Waldo and comedian/broadcaster Judy Croon.
TBA	"Caterer to the Stars/"Invisible Power"/Aerobic Championship"	24 October 1991	25 October 1991	TBA
TBA	"Cutters/Spitting Image/Dolphins"	24 October 1991	25 October 1991	TBA
TBA	"Playboy/Fiddler/Coming Out/Yukon"	23 October 1991	26 October 1991	TBA
Featuring an interview with Dr. Rob Eichberg.
TBA	"Archaos Circus/Stress/Katts"	25 October 1991	27 October 1991	TBA
Featuring an interview with Andrew Bernarski and members of the Archaos circus.
TBA	"Sexy Female Athletes/Kevin Jordon/Andrew Morton"	25 October 1991	28 October 1991	TBA
TBA	"Cartier Jewels/Hume Cronyn/Used People"	26 October 1991	30 October 1991	TBA
Features interviews with actor Hume Cronyn.
TBA	""Madonna"/Graham Kerr/Texas Murder"	29 October 1991	30 October 1991	TBA
TBA	"Halloween Special"	30 October 1991	31 October 1991	TBA
Featuring interviews on Exorcism and possession including: disguised guest "AI" who claims to have been possessed; Fr. James LeBar of the Archdiocese of New York who investigates claims of possession; psychotherapist Adam Crabtree; ESP consultant Paul Gilman speaking on haunted houses; Darby Crewe, employee at The Keg Restaurant which is located in the former mansion of the Massey family and reportedly haunted.
TBA	"Another World Stars/"Do It With the Lights On""	31 October 1991	1 November 1991	TBA
Featuring interviews with actors from soap opera "Another World" including Brian Green ("Sam Fowler") and Steve Schnetzer ("Cass Winthrop").
TBA	"The New Look/Euthanasia/Marcia Levine"	1 November 1991	unknown	TBA
Featuring "The New Look" in modeling including four Canadian finalists for the New York City International Modeling Competition Taujana Mozegoua, Yuliana Vovk, Jenn Moranda, and Vida Zukouskas along with agent Elmer Olsen; interview with widower Ron Adkins, Jeanie Tromp Meesters of the Dutch Society of Voluntary Euthanasia, and MP Chris Axworthy regarding a bill introduced in House of Commons to prompt discussion of euthanasia; exercise demonstration by celebrity fitness instructor Marcia Levine.
TBA	"Brian Carson/Disney/Blossom/Simon"	1 November 1991	4 November 1991	TBA
Featuring segments on Brian Carson of the Disney Channel, and the new television show "Blossom (TV Series)."
TBA	"Red Deer Singer/Agoraphobia/Dinosaurs"	4 November 1991	5 November 1991	TBA
Featuring segments featuring a singer from Red Deer, Alberta; a discussion of agoraphobia, and a feature on the television series "Dinosaurs".
TBA	"Zsa Zsa/Cheese Fondue/Scrabble"	5 November 1991	6 November 1991	TBA
Featuring an interview with actor Zsa Zsa Gabor.
TBA	"Sidney Sheldon/At My Father's Wedding/André-Philippe Gagnon"	6 November 1991	7 November 1991	TBA
Featuring interviews with writer Sidney Sheldon and comedian André-Philippe Gagnon.
TBA	"Darryl Sittler/Dan Hill/Tom Bosley/Tadman"	7 November 1991	8 November 1991	TBA
Featuring interviews with hockey player Darryl Sittler and performance by singer Dan Hill.
TBA	"Gossip! Gossip! Gossip!"	8 November 1991	11 November 1991	TBA
Featuring panel discussions about gossip including: Richard Mineards of The London Daily Express, Janet Charlton of Star Magazine, Scott Seigel author of "The Encyclopedia of Hollywood" and Entertainment reporter Sam Rubin of KTLA-TV in Los Angeles. Includes audiences stories about meeting celebrities.
TBA	"Santa Barbara/Canadian Men Magazine/Generation X"	11 November 1991	12 November 1991	TBA
TBA	"Rolling Stones/"At the Max"/Santa Barbara/Toilet Training Cats/Diane of the Price is Right"	12 November 1991	13 November 1991	TBA
TBA	"Lise Watier/Donald Jessome/Jessi Coulter"	13 November 1991	14 November 1991	TBA
Features interviews with founder of cosmetics company Lise Watier.
TBA	"Nazi Sub Discovery/"Me and Elvis""	14 November 1991	15 November 1991	TBA
TBA	"Joan Rivers/Barbara Coloroso/Voice of Roger/Deadly Currents"	15 November 1991	18 November 1991	TBA
Featuring interviews with Joan Rivers and child psychologist Barbara Coloroso.
TBA	"Tula/Adventure Men"	18 November 1991	19 November 1991	TBA
TBA	"The Dini PEtty Show"	19 November 1991	20 November 1991	TBA
Featuring an interviews with: actor R. H. Thomson; Christopher Hyde author of "Abuse of Trust," regarding the trial of Dr. James Tyhurst charged with emotional and sexual abuse of female patients; and Margaret Visser author of "The Rituals of Dinner."
TBA	"Incest/Ivana Trump/Bear Poaching"	TBA	21 November 1991	TBA
Featuring an interview with Ivana Trump.
TBA	"T. Bennett/D. Dupuis"	21 November 1991	22 November 1991	TBA
Featuring interviews with Tony Bennett and Diane Dupuis.
TBA	""Cathy"/Sarah McLaughlan/Sports Cards/Torkelsons"	22 November 1991	25 November 1991	TBA
Featuring segments and interviews with Sarah McLachlan; the comic strip "Cathy"; sports card trading; and the television show "The Torkelsons."
TBA	"Rich Little/Lost Dakotas"	25 November 1991	26 November 1991	TBA
Featuring interviews with Rich Little, June Lockhart, and Canadian alt country band Lost Dakotas.
TBA	"Michael Feinstein/Alert Survivors/Genesis"	TBA	27 November 1991	TBA
Featuring interviews with Michael Feinstein and the band Genesis.
TBA	"The CASBY Winners/Mitsou/Foreign Commercial Winners"	28 November 1991	29 November 1991	TBA
Featuring an interview and performance by Quebecoise singer Mitsou.
TBA	"Don Herron/Kids Opera/Dr. Wan and Bride"	29 November 1991	2 December 1991	TBA
Featuring an interview with Don Herron.
TBA	"The Dini Petty Show"	TBA	3 December 1991	TBA
Featuring interviews with: author Carol S. Pearson, author of "Awakening the Heroes Within"; rural photographer Richard W. Brown about tips for amateur photographers; and interview and performance by francophone singer Kathleen, who sings "Où aller."
TBA	"Hostages/Pop Catalogue/Dream Warriors"	2 December 1991	3 December 1991	TBA
Featuring interview and performance by Dream Warriors.
TBA	"Beds/Tacky Stuff/The Royals"	TBA	4 December 1991	TBA
TBA	"Liona Boyd/Peg Yorkin/Hearts of Darkness"	3 December 1991	4 December 1991	TBA
Features interviews with feminist Peg Yorkin and interview and performance by guitarist Liona Boyd.
TBA	"Penguins/Marilyn von Derber/John Lennon"	TBA	6 December 1991	TBA
TBA	"Ron Palillo/Martha Stewart/The Sum of Us"	6 December 1991	9 December 1991	TBA
Features interviews with Ron Palillo and Martha Stewart.
TBA	"Christmas Tree/Silken Laumann/World on Edge"	9 December 1991	10 December 1991	TBA
Featuring an interview with Olympian rower Silken Laumann.
TBA	"Nancy Friday/Horsemen/Washboard Hank"	10 December 1991	11 December 1991	TBA
Featuring an interview with Nancy Friday.
TBA	"Zany Gadgets/Violent Men/Elephants"	11 December 1991	12 December 1991	TBA
Featuring: a panel discussion about violence against women with guests Dr. Barbara Pressman of Wilfrid Laurier University, Michael Kaufman of York University, the white ribbon campaign to raise children to be non-violent; Gidgette MacDonald of the Museum of Design discussing zany gadgets for Christmas gifts; an interview with Ronald Orenstein editor of "Elephants: The Deciding Decade" regarding the international ban on ivory.
TBA	"Bonnie Stern/Peter Noone"	12 December 1991	13 December 1991	TBA
Featuring culinary expert Bonnie Stern and singer Peter Noone.
TBA	"Kennedys/Eddie Mekka"	12 December 1991	16 December 1991	TBA
Featuring an interview with Eddie Mekka.
TBA	"Tarnished Angel/Donald O'Connor/Christmas Decorating"	13 December 1991	17 December 1991	TBA
TBA	"Warren Beatty/Xmas Fashion/Xmas Travel/Paula Caplan"	16 December 1991	18 December 1991	TBA
Featuring interviews with Warren Beatty and Paula Caplan.
TBA	"Bonnie Stern/Mother Talk Back/Compulsions"	17 December 1991	19 December 1991	TBA
Featuring interview with Bonnie Stern.
TBA	"Movie Reviews"	19 December 1991	20 December 1991	TBA
Featuring panel discussion of the year's movies including: Lynne McNamara, Richard Rotman of CFNY-FM, Scott Siegel of the Siegal Entertainment Syndicate and Victor Dwyer of Maclean's Magazine.
TBA	"On Set in L.A."	4 December 1991	23 December 1991	TBA
On location in Los Angeles, Dini Petty visits and interviews stars of the Disney Studio television productions. Includes segments with "Dinosaurs" creator and executive producer Michael Jacobs (producer) and co-producer Brian Henson; Mayim Bialik of "Blossom"; Connie Ray and William Schallert of "The Torkelsons"; William Ragsdale and Ken Hudson Campbell of "Herman's Head."
TBA	"Soap Stars"	23 December 1991	24 December 1991	TBA
Features Dini Petty interviewing soap opera stars on set, including: producer John Zack of "The Bold and the Beautiful", Jeff Trachta, Bobbie Eakes, Ronn Moss and Katherine Kelly Lang; Stephen Schnetzer and Brian Lane Green of "Another World"; A Martinez and Judith McConnell of "Santa Barbara."
TBA	"Performers"	24 December 1991	25 December 1991	TBA
An omnibus episode featuring performances by Daryl Braithwaite, George Fox, Dan Hill, Sarah McLachlan, Acosta Russell, and Michelle Wright.
TBA	"Amazing Escapes"	24 December 1991	26 December 1991	TBA
An omnibus episode featuring interviews with various guests including: Irene Govis who fought off a bear; Laurance Leech who fought off a cougar; Dennis Hampton and Larry Myers who were adrift at sea for 5 days and were attacked by sharks; Andrew Emery and his father Bill Emery who survived a car crash; Captain Bob Wagner who rescued Andrew and Bob.
TBA	"Music We Grew Up With"	24 December 1991	27 December 1991	TBA
An omnibus episode featuring performances by Edward Bear, Lighthouse and The Stampeders.
TBA	"Bobbi Bower/Voice Analyst/Ding and Dong"	TBA	27 December 1991	TBA
Featuring an interview with Bobbi Bower.
TBA	"Contest Winner/How to Cure Hangovers/Jeff and Tess"	TBA	30 December 1991	TBA
TBA	"Personalities"	31 December 1991	1 January 1992	TBA
An omnibus episode featuring interviews with Tony Bennett, Joan Rivers, and Ivana Trump.
TBA	"Diane Francis/Dr. Tomorrow/Jon Wilson's Lawyer"	7 January 1992	8 January 1992	TBA
Featuring segments with journalist Diane Francis.
TBA	"Jerry Baker/People Magazine/ Elaine Gottschall"	8 January 1992	9 January 1992	TBA
TBA	"David Cronenberg/Tallest Man/Prairie Oyster"	9 January 1992	10 January 1992	TBA
Featuring interviews with director David Cronenberg and performance by Prairie Oyster.
TBA	"Sam Rubin / Weitzman Shoes for Stars / AIDS from Insemination"	10 January 1992	13 January 1992	TBA
Featuring segments with entertainment reporter Sam Rubin and celebrity shoe designers Weitzman Shoes.
TBA	"Hendrix/Neon/Moe"	13 January 1992	14 January 1992	TBA
Featuring interviews with writer Harville Hendrix and jazz musician Moe Koffman.
TBA	"Breasts/Premarital Sex"	14 January 1992	15 January 1992	TBA
TBA	"End Back Attacks/Athletes' Nutrition/Newman Family"	15 January 1992	16 January 1992	TBA
TBA	"André-Philippe Gagnon/Cult Victims/Brazilian Rain Forest"	16 January 1992	17 January 1992	TBA
Featuring an interview with impressionist André-Philippe Gagnon.
TBA	"Sexually Abused Sisters/Judith Krantz/Women in the NHL"	17 January 1992	20 January 1992	TBA
Featuring a segment on writer and fashion editor Judith Krantz.
TBA	"Men and Marriage/Guardian Angels/McLean Stevenson"	20 January 1992	21 January 1992	TBA
Featuring a segment on actor and comedian McLean Stevenson.
TBA	"Escape Artist/Young Offenders/Reading in 60 Days"	21 January 1992	22 January 1992	TBA
Featuring: interview with escape artist Dean Gunnarson; segment on young offenders including Bill Slattery who was assaulted by four teens and Mary-Anne Kirvan, counsel for Ministry of Justice; and a segment on teaching children to read featuring Sydney Ledson, author of "Teach Your Child to Read in 60 Days" and mother Kristen Size and daughter Charlotte.
TBA	"Autistic Miracle Kid/Flex Appeal/Women Boxing Champions"	TBA	23 January 1992	TBA
Featuring: interviews with and performances by male erotic dance troupe "Flex Appeal" including Lucian Anderson, "Tantalizing T.C.", and "Savage"; interview and demonstration by amateur boxers Jenny Reid (a lawyer from Kingston) and Therese Robitaille (a sign language instructor from New Brunswick); and an interview with Susan Mackie and her daughter Chloe who communicated using facilitated communication techniques.
TBA	"Leather Fashions/Meningitis/Figure Skating Champs"	23 January 1992	24 January 1992	TBA
Featuring: a segment on concerns about a menegitis outbreak in three provinces with interviews with Ernest Zoppa, principal of Hillcrest High School in Ottawa and Dr. Richard Schabas Director of Public Health in Ontario; interview with gold medal Canadian figure champion Karen Preston, pairs skaters Mark Janoschak and Jacqueline Petr; and a fashion show featuring fetish designs by Canadian designer Todd Lynn of the Red Like a Butcher Shop label.
TBA	"Avner Eisenberg/Pat "Miami" Booth/Tony Centa"	24 January 1992	27 January 1992	TBA
Featuring a performance by Avner Eisenberg.
TBA	"Will Steiger/Hypnotism/Outspoken Catholic Priest"	27 January 1992	28 January 1992	TBA
TBA	"Avner Eisenberg/Shot by Husband/Hagood Hardy"	28 January 1992	29 January 1992	TBA
Featuring interviews and performances by Avner Eisenberg and musician Hagood Hardy.
TBA	"Kevin Costner/Clutter/Lawnie Wallace"	29 January 1992	30 January 1992	TBA
Featuring interviews with Kevin Costner and Canadian country singer Lawnie Wallace.
TBA	"Getting Men to Talk/Money Doctor/Richard Jay-Alexander"	31 January 1992	3 February 1992	TBA
Featuring interview with Broadway producer and director Richard Jay-Alexander.
TBA	"AIDS Grandma/Dare to Connect/ Boyz II Men"	3 February 1992	4 February 1992	TBA
Featuring interview and performance by Boyz II Men.
TBA	"Daniel Nestor/Ari Novick/Addicted to Gambling/Frank Mills"	4 February 1992	5 February 1992	TBA
Featuring interview with tennis player Daniel Nestor.
TBA	"Olympic Highlights/Drag Queens"	TBA	TBA	TBA
Featuring: interview with Gloria Edel of Medicine Hat, Alberta and her betrayal by a bigamous British soldier stationed in Germany; session with CK-FM radio djs Humble Howard and Larry Fedoruk about their segment called "The Slime That Men Do"; dramatic and musical performances by female impersonators Chris Peterson ("Julie Andrews") and Carl Blyden ("Katheryn Hepburn") for Casey House Hospice fundraiser for victims of AIDS; discussion with CTV Sports commentator Rod Black re. his picks for Olympic medal hopefuls (including footage of figure skater Kurt Browning, downhill skier Brian Stemmle, figure skating pairs Eisler and Brasseur, bobsledders Chris Lori, speed skater Sylvie Daigle and hockey player Eric Lindros.
TBA	"What a Great Idea!/Handicap Fashions/Collectors"	6 February 1992	7 February 1992	TBA
Featuring a fashion show and interviews with disabled models, including designer Franco Mirabelli, model agent Rhona Mickelson (Star Tracks Model Agency), models Sally Prior, Tammy Walsh, Joanne Smith, Nancy, Wendy Murphy and Kimberly, as well as volunteer Tracey who recently participated in hiking trip through Himalayas as part of a fundraiser for Ontario's March of Dimes; interview with collectors Nick D'Errico (collects dirt from famous sites around world), Joan Hart (collects socks owned by celebrities), Mike Sabadash (photographs of NHL athletes) and Doug Steele (beer bottles and cans); and interview with author Chick Thompson ("What A Great Idea!") about overcoming mental blocks.
TBA	"Jane Russell/Through Teddy's Eyes/Blackwell's List"	7 February 1992	10 February 1992	TBA
TBA	"Fashion and Health/Daphne Rose Kingma/"Inside Passage""	10 February 1992	11 February 1992	TBA
Featuring interview with self-help author Daphne Kingma.
TBA	"Debbie Johnson/High School Crime/Killer Elephant"	11 February 1992	12 February 1992	TBA
TBA	"Family Birth/Coronation Street/Eric Nagler"	13 February 1992	12 February 1992	TBA
TBA	"Weddings/Ned Beatty"	13 February 1992	14 February 1992	TBA
TBA	"Bonnie Sterne/Joyce DeWitt/Florence Henderson/Brian Stemmie"	14 February 1992	17 February 1992	TBA
TBA	"Dr. Joyce Brothers/Cassandra Vasik/Illness In Your Head"	17 February 1992	18 February 1992	TBA
TBA	"Canadian Achievers/Michael Smith/Raffi"	19 February 1992	20 February 1992	TBA
TBA	"Knitwear Fashion/Larry Coker/Famous People Players"	20 February 1992	21 February 1992	TBA
TBA	"A Star is Worn/Flapping Airplane/Adoption Battle"	21 February 1992	24 February 1992	TBA
featuring interview and fashion show by Michelle Stafford of A Star Is Worn celebrity fashion resale boutique in Los Angeles; interview with Maureen Steenhill a teenage mother who is in a custody battle with Peter Brossard over her desire to have child adopted, including Hunter Phillips, Brossard's lawyer and phone‐in testimony by Steenhill's lawyer Ian Stauffer and "Mary", the adoptive parent who had to give infant back to Steenhill while matter was before courts. Ends with interview with James DeLaurier co‐inventor of 'ornathopter', a flying machine which operates like a bird, including his daughter April demonstrating how her pet bat Cassandra provided the inspiration for the design.
TBA	"Deb Gallo/Talent Winners/Jewelry"	24 February 1992	25 February 1992	TBA
TBA	"Addicted Doc/Horse Doc/Freedom"	25 February 1992	26 February 1992	TBA
episode featuring recovering alcoholic and drug addict Dr. Michael Palmer ("Extreme Measures") about addiction; interviews with chiropractor Dr. Janic Elenbaas and therapist Jeff Ginn who work exclusively with horses; a set by comedian Mark Farrell; and interview with author Alison Gzowski ("Facing Freedom") about her experience interviewing teens in Easter Europe following the fall of Communism.
TBA	"Pregnant and Shipwrecked/The Body Image/The National Image"	28 February 1992	27 February 1992	TBA
Featuring interview with Allison Wilcox who was shipwrecked at sea with crew while 5 months pregnant, including Eddy Provost, one of the crew members, her baby son Eddy and her husband Steve Wilcox; interview with author Marion Crook ("The Body Image Trap") re. female body image and dieting including interview with show's floor manager Mary and members of audience; and Orangeville disk jockey Ross Carlin and music producer Hayward Parrott re. their efforts to record a new version of the national anthem, including footage of CTV documentary of project "With Glowing Hearts".
TBA	"Vanessa Williams/Katarina Witt"	27 February 1992	28 February 1992	TBA
TBA	"Gerry Baker/Lionel Tiger/He and She"	27 February 1992	1 March 1992	TBA
TBA	"Olympic Medal Winner/Richard Flint/Moe Brandy"	28 February 1992	3 March 1992	TBA
TBA	"Jim Perry/Divorce Busters/Babies Denied Health Care"	3 March 1992	4 March 1992	TBA
Featuring interviews with former TV host Jim Perry discussing his memoir, "The Sleeper Awakes, A Journey to Self-Awareness" and writer Michelle Weiner-Davis, author of "Divorce Busting: A Step-By-Step Approach to Making Your Marriage Loving Again."
TBA	"Santa Barbara Star/Overcoming Addiction"	4 March 1992	5 March 1992	TBA
Episode featuring: interview with "Santa Barbara" soap opera actress Eileen Davidson, including questions from the audience and interview with author Collette Dowling ("You Mean I Don't Have To Feel This Way?") about new approaches to psychological problems such as anorexia, alcoholism, and compulsive disorders.
TBA	"Hot Dog Vendor/Ben Cross/Ozone Danger"	5 March 1992	6 March 1992	TBA
TBA	"Designer Leon Hall/Pigs: Pet of the 90s"	TBA	9 March 1992	TBA
TBA	"Elvis/Jeff Healey/The Sacred Earth"	9 March 1992	TBA	TBA
TBA	"Run Bambi Run/Cellulite/Simon Alexander"	10 March 1992	11 March 1992	TBA
TBA	"Obsessed Lovers/Ratings/Puppy Mills"	11 March 1992	12 March 1992	TBA
TBA	"Starr and Mandel/Allery Madness/Dini and Pam Wallin"	12 March 1992	13 March 1992	TBA
Featuring an interview with broadcaster Pamela Wallin.
TBA	"Teen Prom/Lloyd Robertson/Comedian Bill Hicks"	13 March 1992	16 March 1992	TBA
TBA	"St. Patrick's Day Special/Fugitive Trading Cards/Teen Magazine"	16 March 1992	17 March 1992	TBA
Episode featuring: interview with Toronto resident Debby Argyropoulos who got 21" cut from her 41" hair; an interview with parents Crystal and Bruce of missing child Michael Dunahee, crime expert James Fox and Barry Hammond, of America's Trading Cards Inc. of Sun City, Arizona which developed trading cards featuring missing children and America's Most Wanted; 'Teen Week' panel discussion with editors of teen magazines including Bonnie Hurowitz‐Fuller (YM); Sarah Smith Patton (Seventeen) and Mary Kay Schilling (Sassy); ends with set by Irish comedian Jim Loftus.
TBA	"Memory Trainer/Teen Hollywood Gossip/Erich Segal"	TBA	18 March 1992	TBA
TBA	"Teen Abuse/Vanessa Vaughan/Eddie Albert"	18 March 1992	19 March 1992	TBA
TBA	"Mayim Bialik/Absent Fathers/Doug Henning"	19 March 1992	20 March 1992	TBA
TBA	"Hallie Bryant/Larry Horowitz/Mark Victor Hansen"	20 March 1992	23 March 1992	TBA
TBA	"Adrien Arpel/Barb Taylor Bradford/Morquid's Syndrome"	23 March 1992	24 March 1992	TBA
TBA	"Oscar! Oscar! Oscar!"	27 March 1992	30 March 1992	TBA
Episode featuring a panel discussion regarding the 64th Annual Academy Awards, including Scott Siegel, Lynne McNamara, Victor Dwyer (Mclean's Magazine) and David Hutchings (People Magazine).
TBA	"Mother/Daughter Makeovers/Oscars/Marianne Williamson"	24 March 1992	25 March 1992	TBA
TBA	"Pam Wallin/Fire Proofing/Power of One"	25 March 1992	26 March 1992	TBA
Featuring interview with Pamela Wallin.
TBA	"Juno Awards Special/Covert Bailey"	26 March 1992	27 March 1992	TBA
TBA	"Marriages"	30 March 1992	31 March 1992	TBA
Omnibus episode featuring previously broadcast slips re. love and marriage. Includes interview with Dr. Peter Wen (26) and his wife Willie (74); author Dr. William Nagler ("The Dirty Half Dozen"); Gloria Edel of Medicine Hat, Alberta who almost married a bigamous British soldier stationed in Germany; and therapist Dr. Harry Dunne Jr. ("One Question That Will Save Your Marriage") who asks couples "What is it like to be married to me?".
TBA	"Women in Sports"	31 March 1992	2 April 1992	TBA
Omnibus episode featuring previous clips regarding re. women in sports. Includes interview and demonstration by amateur boxers Jenny Reid and Terese Robitaille; interview with figure skater Katrina Witt and interview with goalie Manon Rhéaume, the first woman to play in junior hockey.
TBA	"Magic"	30 March 1992	3 April 1992	TBA
Omnibus episode featuring previously broadcast clips re. magic. Includes interviews and demonstrations by illusionist and hypnotist Kreskin ("Secrets of the Amazing Kreskin"); escape artist Dean Gunnarson; illusionist Steve Starr (swallows objects); and performance by clown Avner Eisenburg.
TBA	"Survivors"	31 March 1992	4 April 1992	TBA
Omnibus episode featuring previously broadcast clips re. survivors. Includes interviews with Allison Wilcox and Eddy Provost, who were lost at sea while Wilcox was 5 months pregnant; mother Kathy Lawler who was trapped on a rampaging elephant with her children at a Palm Bay Florida circus, with Corp. Blaine Doyle, the police officer who saved her children and was forced to shoot the elephant, and elephant expert Mike Hackenberger; and teen Mark Mathews who survived a mass shooting in Killeen, Texas by George Hennard. Mathews survived by hiding in an industrial dish washer for 19 hours.
TBA	"Another World Soap Stars/Pet Abuse/AIDS Proofing"	4 April 1992	6 April 1992	TBA
Episode featuring interview with "Another World" soap opera stars Ricky Paull Goldin ("Dean Frame") and Alla Korot ("Jenna Norris") re. their musical collaboration on the music video "Lady Killer" including questions from the audience; interview with author Dr. Loren Acker ("AIDS proofing your kids") and a discussion on pet abuse, including footage of Martha Schissler, senior investigator with the Toronto SPCA, and Michael O'Sullivan of the World Society for the Protection of Animals and Dr. Alan Felthous, who draws a link between animal abuse and adult violence.
TBA	"Russians on Broadway/Celine Dion/Kennebunkport House Contest"	8 April 1992	7 April 1992	TBA
TBA	"Hat Couturier/Reunion/Dolly Parton"	8 April 1992	9 April 1992	TBA
TBA	"Nellies/Anne Rule/Chess"	9 April 1992	10 April 1992	TBA
Features interviews and features with/about Sheila McCarthy, Anne Rule, and Colm Wilkinson.
TBA	"Child Stars/Sign & Seal/Kidd Sisters"	13 April 1992	14 April 1992	TBA
Episodes featuring: panel discussion with child actors in commercials and their mothers (Lynn Nicol and son Chandler Nicol, Jean Walker and daughter Lea‐Helen Weir, and Joseph Posca and his mother); interviews with talent agents Susie Feinstein and Penny Noble; interview with author Graham Hancock re. ark of the covenant ("The Sign And The Seal"); and performance and interview with trio The Kidd Sisters (Yohanna Vandercliff and Margo Salnek).
TBA	"Manley/Ferry/Valdy"	14 April 1992	15 April 1992	TBA
Episode featuring interviews with Rev. Jim Ferry and Elizabeth Manley.
TBA	"Ann Lawrence Fashions/The Infidels/Scott Flansburg"	TBA	16 April 1992	TBA
TBA	"Herb Doctor/16 Magazine Gossip/Highway 61"	16 April 1992	17 April 1992	TBA
Episode featuring interviews with author Dr. Earl Mindell ("The Herb Bible"), Randy Reisfeld, author of the "Teen Celebrity" book series; and actor/screenwriter Don McKellar and director Bruce McDonald re. their film "Highway 61."
TBA	"Home Education/12-year-old Guitarist/Tiffany Ward/Ballroom Dance Champions"	19 April 1992	20 April 1992	TBA
TBA	"Glass Tiger/Kaffe Fassett/Spy Tech/Linda Evans and Yanni"	20 April 1992	21 April 1992	TBA
Featuring interview and performance by band Glass Tiger and fashion designer Kaffe Fassett.
TBA	"Leon Hall/Stress/Ofra Harney"	21 April 1992	22 April 1992	TBA
Featuring interview and performance with cellist Ofra Harney.
TBA	"Canadian Patriots/D. Weaver"	22 April 1992	23 April 1992	TBA
TBA	"G.W. Bailey/World's Fastest Reader/Nathaniel Branden"	23 April 1992	24 April 1992	TBA
TBA	""Mila"/Carol Bennett/Kevin Leamen"	24 April 1992	27 April 1992	TBA
TBA	"Mr. Blackwell/Betty Mahmoody/Spy Tech"	27 April 1992	28 April 1992	TBA
TBA	"Ivana Trump/Leo Buscaglia"	28 April 1992	29 April 1992	TBA
Episode featuring interviews and/or features on Ivana Trump and Leo Buscaglia.
TBA	"Oscar de la Renta/"How To" Sex Videos/Patrick Swayze"	29 April 1992	30 April 1992	TBA
Episode featuring interviews and/or features on Oscar de la Renta and Patrick Swayze.
TBA	"Anson Williams/Butterbox Babies/Graduated Licensing"	30 April 1992	1 May 1992	TBA
Episode featuring interviews and/or segments on actor Anson Williams, author Bette L. Cahill, author of "Butterbox Babies" and new provincial programs on graduated licensing for new drivers.
TBA	"Geraint Wyn Davis/Men's Journal/Women's World Hockey"	1 May 1992	4 May 1992	TBA
TBA	"Morgan Fairchild"	4 May 1992	5 May 1992	TBA
TBA	"Neaderthals at Work/Hot and Bothered/Sylvia Tyson"	5 June 1992	6 May 1992	TBA
TBA	"John Bradshaw/Neil Sedaka"	6 May 1992	7 May 1992	TBA
TBA	"Corey Feldman/Nadia Comǎneci"	7 May 1992	8 May 1992	TBA
TBA	"Swearing Student/Kim Mitchell/Bonnie Stern"	11 May 1992	8 May 1992	TBA
TBA	"Men of Cuba/Beer with J. Maxwell/Iridology"	11 May 1992	12 May 1992	TBA
Episode featuring a fashion show with Hazelton Lanes' Mary Raichins featuring male models from Cuba (Jorge Alvarez, Michael Aaron Delgado, Michael Louis Carricarte); interviews with Cuban models in their bathing suits re. their swimsuit calendar; a segment on beer tasting with John Maxwell and an interview with author Adam J. Jackson on iridology.
TBA	"Marilyn French/A Kind of Family/Dr. Des Morris"	11 May 1992	13 May 1992	TBA
TBA	"Richard Simmons"	13 May 1992	14 May 1992	TBA
TBA	"Linda Evans and Yanni"	14 May 1992	15 May 1992	TBA
TBA	"Soap Star Gossip/Wedding Fashions/Lady Di"	18 May 1992	TBA	15 May 1992
TBA	"Carol North/John Kapelos/Max"	16 May 1992	19 May 1992	TBA
TBA	""The Juiceman"/Chita Rivera/Lethal Lovers"	19 May 1992	20 May 1992	TBA
TBA	"Loretta Swit/Dr. Ethics"	20 May 1992	21 May 1992	TBA
TBA	"Mariah Carey/"The Waterdance""	21 May 1992	22 May 1992	TBA
TBA	"How to Satisfy a Woman/Cat People/Cancer Clinic-Sherry Abbott"	27 May 1992	28 May 1992	TBA
TBA	"Kissing Bandit/J.F.K."	22 May 1992	25 May 1992	TBA
Episode featuring interview with author Dr. Charles Crenshaw about his book "J.F.K.: Conspiracy of Silence," and interview with Morgana, the Kissing Bandit, a woman who interrupts professional sporting events (typically baseball) to kiss athletes.
TBA	"Live Unity Hour/Buffy Sainte-Marie/Seals and Crofts"	25 May 1992	26 May 1992	TBA
Featuring performances by artists slated to perform at the Live Unity Concert celebrating the Baha'i Holy Year of 1992-1993, including Buffy Sainte-Marie and Seals and Crofts.
TBA	"Carling Bassett/Sex Doctor/The Real Me is a Shock"	26 May 1992	27 May 1992	TBA
Featuring interviews with Canadian tennis star Carling Bassett and Jill Solnicki, author of "The Real Me is Gonna Be a Shock" about her experience teaching special education in Ontario schools.
TBA	""Marilyn and Me"/Leading Men"	28 May 1992	29 May 1992	TBA
Episode featuring: author Susan Strasberg ("Marilyn and Me: Sisters, Rivals, Friends"); performances and interviews with Toronto's theatre actors who serenade Dini with a romantic show tunes. Includes Theodore (Ted) Baerg (then appearing in Il Barbiere di Siviglia) performing "Love Unspoken" from The Merry Widow, Michael Burgess (Les Misérables) performing title tune of "Anyone Can Whistle" and Byron Nease (Phantom of the Opera) performing "Proud Lady" from The Baker's Wife.
TBA	"Soap Stars/John James"	29 May 1992	1 June 1992	TBA
TBA	"Daphne R. Kingma/Merry Men of Barbados/Searching for your Roots"	1 June 1992	2 June 1992	TBA
Featuring interview segments with self-help author Daphne Kingma and performance by The Merry Men, a calypso band from Barbados.
TBA	"Francis Lear/Brenda Lee"	2 June 1992	3 June 1992	TBA
TBA	"Longest Hair/Instruction Book/Cancer Guide/Bungee"	3 June 1992	4 June 1992	TBA
Featuring segments on a contest to find women in Canada with longest hair, author H. Jackson Brown ("Life's Little Instruction Book"), cancer prevention, and bungee jumping.
TBA	"Youth to Everest/Cottages/Look of the Year"	5 June 1992	8 June 1992	TBA
Episode featuring model agents Elmer Olsen and Ann Sutherland re. "The Look Of The Year" model search, a makeover and demonstration of modeling by aspiring model Leyla Boyd assisted by hairstylist Charles Christopher and makeup artist Lesley of Plutino Group, fashion photographer Malcolm Tweedy and stylist Kevin Stewart; interview with author Judy Ross ("Summer Cottages") and interview with organizers Jill Sharpe and Dawn Sinko and participants in the "Youth to Everest" program who travel to communities around Mount Everest and pick up garbage.
TBA	"Patti Duke"	8 June 1992	9 June 1992	TBA
Episode featuring Patti Duke in a full hour interview about her experience as a child actor, her bipolar disorder, and her memoir "Call Me Anna."
TBA	"Kids Kidnapped by Cult/Weight Watchers"	TBA	10 June 1992	TBA
Episode featuring interviews with mother Judith Seymour and Montreal‐based Info‐Cult spokesperson Mike Kropveld re. religious cult the Northeast Kingdom Church, based in Clark's Harbour, Nova Scotia and Seymour's efforts to regain custody of her son being kept there by her former common law husband. Also includes interview with founder of Weight Watchers, Jean Nidetch, including a testimony from audience member Jeff Gray.
TBA	"Comedy/Bachelor Book"	TBA	11 June 1992	TBA
Featuring segment on "male order catalogue" "Bachelor Book" with publisher Mindi Rudan and six eligible bachelors including Marc Coons, David Anthony, Colin Campbell and Paul d'Entremont. and interviews and performances by comedians Tim Conlon, Ellen Mitchcock and Bob Kirk ("The Out Of The Way Players") and Jeremy Hotz.
TBA	"Scott Goodyear/Nana Mouskouri/Snoopy Collector"	11 June 1992	12 June 1992	TBA
TBA	"The Dini Petty Show"	12 June 1992	15 June 1992	TBA
Episode featuring: a demonstration of women's wrestling by Sean Norris, referee for the Amateur Wrestling Association, and Christine Nordhagen of Edmonton, Alberta and Jen Saigle of Swift Current, Saskatchewan; an interview of author Helen Irlen ("Reading By the Colors") including feedback from three young men in the audience, Nick, Harold and Carlo, who have difficulty reading; and a discussion and video tour by Lynda Reeves re. annual contest for best home by "House and Home" magazine.
TBA	"The Dini Petty Show"	16 June 1992	17 June 1992	TBA
Episode featuring an interview of single older male cruise hosts Richard Catalano and Fred Ellis; presentation of environmentally conscious fashion line by Esprit ("Eco‐lection") by designer Lynda Grose; and performance by and interview of "FunnyGay Males" comedians Danny McWilliams, Bob Smith and Jaffe Cohen.
TBA	"The Dini Petty Show"	17 June 1992	19 June 1992	TBA
Episode featuring: interview with author and food critic Scott Mowbray ("The Food Fight") re. food trends, a performance ("I'm Alive") and interview with singer SueMedley; and interview with Trudy Parsons, a health care worker fired when she contracted AIDS and lawyer Gerry Heddema, of the Advocacy Resource Centre for the Handicapped in Toronto, who specializes in discrimination cases involving victims of AIDS.
TBA	"Canada Day Special"	3 June 1992	1 July 1992	TBA
Canada Day Special featuring previously aired clips of Dini Petty Show episodes taped around Canada. Includes clips from episodes filmed in Halifax, Montreal, Edmonton, Regina, Banff, Toronto, Ottawa and Vancouver. Includes guests EarleMcRae (founding director of Elvis Sighting Society), Vancouver real estate agent Andrea Eng, architect Jin Cheng, alderwoman Carole Taylor re. Asian immigration and housing in Vancouver; clips from "The Heart of Quebec" interview with children's film producer RochDemers, entertainer and writer Pauline Julien, cartoonist Terry Mosher on francophone culture; unemployed fish plant worker Pat Ferguson, United Mine Workers rep Joe Burke and Al McDonald of CFB Summerside on economic depression in the Maritimes; financial advisor Brian Costello on recession issues in London, Ontario; retail analyst John Winter on cross‐border shopping; Debbie Reynolds of the Elizabeth Fry Society and Lynn Karpetz (daughter was a murdered sex worker) on street kids; Theresa Stephenson on 'Chili for Children' program in Winnipeg; Fred Caswell (heart recipient), Heather Fisher (liver recipient) and Sally Galsworthy (donated daughters organs) on transplants; Andrew Morton ("Diana: Her True Story") on Princess Diana; Toronto police horse 'King', George Smith an Alzheimer's patient; John C. Charyk, Lorna Jarvis and Eugene Kush (town fool) of Hanna, Alberta; three unidentified female impersonators; "Mr. Tomorrow" futurist Frank Ogden; trans activist Angela Wensley; National Ballet School performers, music performers Luba, Jim Corcoran, Jean Marc [of band La Bas?], Daniel Lavoie, Colin James, Rita McNeil, The Rankin Family, Michelle Wright, George Fox, impersonator Andre Phillipe Gagnon, Celine Dion and local activists Jim Taylor ("Save Canada" billboards) and Agnes Potts and Connie Micallef ("Canadian First" t‐shirts).
