= Raymond Smith (dancer) =

Canadian ballet dancer and teacher

Raymond Smith is a Canadian ballet dancer and teacher, who was a principal dancer of the National Ballet of Canada from 1980 to 1995.

== Biography ==
Raymond Smith was born in Edinburgh, Scotland, and immigrated to Canada at the age of seven. He began dancing lessons in London, Ontario, at the age of 11, and entered Canada's National Ballet School at the age of 12. Upon graduating in 1975, he joined the corps de ballet of the National Ballet of Canada, making his professional debut at the Metropolitan Opera House in New York in Coppélia. He was promoted to the rank of second soloist in 1978, to first soloist in 1979, and to principal dancer in 1980. During the 1985-86 season, he was a principal dancer with London Festival Ballet. Smith performed as a guest artist at La Scala, with Scottish Ballet, Hong Kong Ballet, Pittsburgh Ballet Theater and Royal Winnipeg Ballet. He also appeared as a contemporary dancer with the Desrosiers Dance Theatre at the Calgary Olympic Arts Festival in 1988. His decade-long stage partnership with ballerina Veronica Tennant was particularly admired by critics.

Smith retired from the stage in May 1995, following a performance as one of the Stepsisters in Ben Stevenson's Cinderella. He subsequently worked as a ballet master for Ontario Ballet Theatre, Ballet BC and BalletMet. Since 2004 he has been on the faculty of Canada's National Ballet School.

== Repertoire ==
Smith's repertoire included La Sylphide (James, Gurn), Napoli (Gennaro, pas de six) Giselle (Count Albrecht, pas de quatre) Coppélia (Franz), Swan Lake (Prince, pas de trois) The Sleeping Beauty (Prince Florimund, Bluebird), Celia Franca's and Ronald Hynd's productions of The Nutcracker (Prince), Don Quixote (Basilio), the third act of Raymonda (Jean de Brienne), Michel Fokine's Les Sylphides and Le Spectre de la rose, Frederick Ashton's Romeo and Juliet (Romeo, Mercutio), La Fille mal gardée (Colas), The Two Pigeons (Young Man) and Monotones II, John Cranko's Romeo and Juliet (Romeo), Onegin (Lensky, Onegin) and The Taming of the Shrew (Lucentio), Hynd's The Merry Widow (Camille de Rosillon; a role filmed by the Canadian Broadcasting Corporation), George Balanchine's Serenade, Concerto Barocco, The Four Temperaments (Melancholic, Sanguinic) and Symphony in C (third movement), Anton Dolin's Variations for Four, Antony Tudor's The Leaves Are Fading, Kenneth MacMillan's Elite Syncopations, Song of the Earth (the Man) and Concerto, Glen Tetley's Sphinx (Oedipus), Alice (White Rabbit), La Ronde (the Count) and Tagore, Maurice Béjart's Song of a Wayfarer, Harald Lander's Etudes, Anne Ditchburn's Mad Shadows (Patrice; a role filmed by the CBC), Constantin Patsalas' Liebestod (filmed by the Société Radio-Canada) and L'île inconnue (filmed by the CBC), Robert Desrosiers' Blue Snake (filmed by the National Film Board of Canada), William Forsythe's the second detail and several ballets created by James Kudelka and John Alleyne.
