= Simone Orlando =

Canadian ballet dancer and choreographer

Simone Orlando is a Canadian choreographer, retired principal dancer, and the Artistic Director of Ballet Kelowna, born in Vancouver, British Columbia. Orlando received her early dance training at the Carisbrooke School of Dance, the Vancouver Academy of Dance, and the Goh Ballet Academy. She completed her training at the National Ballet School in Toronto and subsequently joined the National Ballet of Canada in 1989 under the direction of Reid Anderson where she danced a wide range of repertoire from the ballets of John Cranko and Kenneth MacMillan to those of George Balanchine and Glen Tetley. In 1995, Robert Desrosiers invited her to join Desrosiers Dance Theatre, where she originated roles in several new productions and toured to Brazil and Aruba. In 1996, Orlando joined Ballet British Columbia under the direction of John Alleyne where she danced for twelve years as principal artist, joining the reorganised Ballet BC as Artist in Residence for 2009–10. She has performed in theatres and festivals around the world including The Kennedy Centre, The Joyce Theatre, The Bayerische Staatsoper, The Hong Kong Cultural Centre, Cervantino Festival, Canada Dance Festival, and Ballet Expo Seoul. While dancing with Ballet BC, Orlando was prominently featured in new creations by John Alleyne, garnering accolades for her performances as Blanche Dubois in A Streetcar Named Desire, Puck in The Faerie Queen, Fate in Carmina Burana, and the Elder in The Rite of Spring. She has also created roles with James Kudelka, Crystal Pite, Dominique Dumais, Mikko Nissenen, and Jean Grand-Maitre and has been featured in the works of William Forsythe, Paul Taylor, Nicolo Fonte, Jiri Kylian, Martha Graham, and Twyla Tharp, among others. Orlando also taught and set repertoire on the dancers of Ballet BC and the pre-professionals in the Ballet BC Mentor Program.

== Choreography ==
Orlando's career as a choreographer began in 1997. Her work has been presented at the Vancouver International Dance Festival, Dancing on the Edge, the Chutzpah Festival, Romp!, and Dances for a Small Stage. She has received numerous commissions including from Ballet Kelowna, Move: the company, the Turning Point Ensemble, Dancers Dancing, and a short dance film, Chimère, for BRAVO! TV. Recent creations include, Studies of Cash, a work inspired by the songs of Johnny Cash for EDAM, Realm and Doppeling for Ballet British Columbia, and Assembly for Toronto Dance Theatre. She has also created, co-produced and performed in a short dance film, Duet, for CODE Motion Pictures for the Vancouver 2010 Cultural Olympiad.

== Awards ==
Orlando was the inaugural recipient of the Performing Arts Commission at the 2004 Vancouver Arts Awards and won the prestigious 2006 Clifford E. Lee Choreography Award for which she created the work, Winter Journey, at the Banff Centre. In 2009, she received a Fellowship Initiative Grant from the New York Choreographic Institute, an affiliate of New York City Ballet, to develop new choreography on the dancers of Ballet BC.
