= Lorna Geddes =

Canadian ballerina (born 1943)

Lorna Geddes (born 1943) is a Canadian ballerina who worked with the National Ballet of Canada for 59 years.

== Early life and training ==
Geddes was born in Waterloo, Ontario and began dancing at the age of three. After training with National Ballet School of Canada co-founder Betty Oliphant, Geddes joined the National Ballet of Canada in 1959 as a member of the Corps de Ballet at the age of 16 under the Artistic Director and company founder Celia Franca. She was appointed Assistant Ballet Mistress in 1984, and became Pointe Shoe Manager in 1998. She was promoted to Principal Character Artist in 2005, and was known for her "signature role" as the Nurse in Romeo and Juliet. She retired at the end of the 2018/2019 season.

== Personal life ==
Geddes married Macedonian-born Hazaros Surmeyan in 1968 and their marriage lasted until his death in 2026. Surmeyan had joined the National Ballet of Canada in 1966, and later became Principal Character Artist in 1986. Together, they had one son, André.

== Awards ==
In 2008, Geddes received the inaugural David Tony Award.
