= Anne Ditchburn =

Canadian ballet dancer, choreographer, and film actress

Anne Ditchburn (born October 4, 1949) is a Canadian ballet dancer, choreographer, and film actress headlining films like 1979's Slow Dancing in the Big City as a dancer with a crippling disease, a film directed by Rocky director John G. Avildsen and co-starring Paul Sorvino. She also played the doomed ballet dancer Laurian Summers in the 1983 cult horror film Curtains with John Vernon and Samantha Eggar. She danced in nearly all of her film credits, and earned a Golden Globe nomination for her work in Slow Dancing in the Big City. In her time with the National she choreographed some of its most distinguished pieces of the 1970s, including Mad Shadows and Kisses, while also heading side company Ballet Revue.

== Early life ==
Ditchburn was born on October 4, 1949, in Sudbury, Ontario. When she was three, her father moved her, her mother, and her four siblings to Mississauga. Sensing a natural flair for dancing in his daughter, Ditchburn's father began enrolling her in private lessons with Janet Baldwin, who helped her attain her a role in her first major ballet when she was 11, as "Gold" in a 1961 production of Hungarian. Baldwin trained her until she was fourteen, when the instructor suggested she audition for the National Ballet School, something Ditchburn later stated was "the best experience of [her] life". Her first public ballet was at age 19, when the then National Ballet of Canada artistic director and founder Celia Franca decided to produce Ditchburn's own Brown Earth.

== Career ==
Ditchburn was a notable member of the National Ballet of Canada from 1967 to 1979, where she worked as both a dancer and a prominent choreographer (one of the few females to do so). She was influenced by the then artistic director Alexander Grant, as well as fellow ballerina Karen Kain.

Sometime during the period Ditchburn worked with Ballet Ys to choreograph Nelligan, with Claudia Moore. Moore would go on to describe Ditchburn's direction as both "rebellious" and "contemporary", a "thrill" to see.

Her final and most famous role in the company was for the 1977 ballet Mad Shadows, which she also exclusively choreographed after feuding with fellow choreographer James Kudelka. The production premiered on February 16 at the O'Keefe Centre in Toronto and was enormously successful, with a televised version playing at the Royal Opera House, Covent Garden, and the Metropolitan Opera. Critical reaction was also positive, with Linda Howe-Beck of The Gazette calling it a "first-class" show. Despite the praise, Ditchburn regarded the piece as "naive in the international sense" but still "appropriate for the time".

Ditchburn resigned from the company because, as stated in the October 1979 issue of Cinema Canada, she felt that "my life isn't going anywhere fast enough," choosing instead to pursue a career as a film actress, as well as freelance choreography. Other issues revolving around her resignation were creative differences with Alexander Grant, as well as complaints about insufficient facilities and a general low morale though the company. Fellow National members Karen Kain and Frank Augustyn agreed with the choreographers statements, though remained with the company.

For her television and film career, Ditchburn first worked on variety shows, including choreography for the Irish-Canadian band Ryan's Fancy on a 1973 episode of Singalong Jubilee, while her first on-screen appearance was on a December 1976 episode of the Peter Gzowski talk show 90 Minutes Live, where she performed a ballet routine with pianist Andre Gagnon.

To obtain the role of dancer Sarah Gantz in Slow Dancing, it was stated that director John Avildsen had seen a photograph of her dancing and could not get her image out of his head, so he invited her to an audition. She later stated that her initial audition was a "disaster" due to her inexperience in the profession, but she "gradually improved". Reaction to her performance was mixed, though it did earn her a nomination at the Golden Globe Awards for Best Newcomer. Ditchburn also choreographed her dance scenes in the film, something she would repeat in the 1982 Six Weeks and the 1983 film Curtains, where she had top billing as well as helped choreograph both her own and her co-star Lesleh Donaldson's performance scenes. Reaction to her performance in Curtains was mixed, with Cinema Canada's Andrew Dowler stating in his review of the film in 1984 that she, as well as several other actresses in the film, was not "on-screen long enough for me to be certain [she is] in the final print, let alone long enough to develop character." In an interview with producer and director Peter Simpson, he stated that "You know, it's a very obvious omission but we should have had more bits of stuff... even short scenes with Anne to pay off her death. She's not in it enough."

She later worked as a choreographer and a performer in short films like Leonard Cohen's I Am a Hotel and several shorts by Jurgen Lutz, most famously A Moving Picture. Ditchburn also worked as an editor for the 1992 film Killer Image with Michael Ironside, a creative producer for the 1997 TV movie Truth About Lying (or Loss of Faith) with John Ritter, and as the production manager for the 1999 film Pocahontas: The Legend. Lutz would later call her a "gifted dancer, choreographer and author".

== Personal life ==
On November 11, 1979, two months after her resignation from the National Ballet of Canada, Ditchburn married Ray Wagner. Wagner, the vice-president of MGM's Production Department after the two had met at the last Golden Globes ceremony. The couple divorced in 1986, some time before Wagner's death in 2014.

== Filmography ==
Year	Film	Role	Notes
1976	90 Minutes Live	Herself	Talk Show performance
1976	Adolphe Adam Giselle	Princess Bathilde	Televised Ballet
1978	Slow Dancing in the Big City^{a}	Sarah Gantz	Nominated for a Golden Globe Award
1979	The Merv Griffin Show	Herself	Talk show interview
1980	Coming Out Alive	Jane	Made for Television
1983	Six Weeks^{a}	Anne, the Assistant Choreographer	As Ann Ditchburn
1983	I Am a Hotel^{a}	The Gypsy Wife	Television Short Film
1983	Curtains^{a}	Laurian Summers	Filmed in 1980
1985	Spoleto^{a}	Herself	Jurgen Lutz Promotional Documentary
1987	Breathe and Fly^{a}	Dancer	Jurgen Lutz Short
1989	A Moving Picture^{a}	Dancer	Jurgen Lutz Telefilm

^a Also worked as choreographer.
