= Elena Lobsanova =

Russian-Canadian ballet dancer

- Born: 1985 or 1986 (age 38–39); Moscow, USSR
- Education: Canada's National Ballet School
- Occupation: ballet dancer
- Years active: 2004–present
- Career
- Current group: Miami City Ballet
- Former groups: National Ballet of Canada

Elena Lobsanova (born 1985 or 1986) is a Russian-Canadian ballet dancer. She joined the National Ballet of Canada in 2004 and was promoted to principal dancer in 2015. In 2020, she joined the Miami City Ballet.

== Early life and training ==
Lobsanova was born in Moscow. Her father was a microbiologist. As a child, she and her family moved to Toronto. She did not dance in Russia, and started her ballet training in 1996, when she was nine, at the outreach program of Canada's National Ballet School. In fifth grade, she started attending the school full-time, where she studied both ballet and academics. In 1997 and 1998, she danced the role of Marie in James Kudelka's The Nutcracker with the National Ballet of Canada. At the school's spring showcase in 2004, Lobsanova was chosen to dance Odette in the second act of Swan Lake. In preparation for the performance, she was coached by Karen Kain, then the artistic associate and former principal dancer of the National Ballet.

== Career ==
In 2004, when Lobsanova was seventeen, she was offered an apprenticeship with the National Ballet of Canada, after she completed both professional ballet training and high school. Although Mavis Staines, the artistic director of the school, wanted her to train for another year, Lobsanova accepted the contract. The following year, she injured her second metatarsal bone. She was later promoted to second soloist. In 2009, Lobsanova and Noah Long were chosen to represent the company at the Erik Bruhn Prize.

In 2011, Lobsanova was promoted to first soloist. She was then chosen by Alexei Ratmansky to dance the world premiere of his version of Romeo and Juliet as Juliet. Later that year, she made her debut as the Sugar Plum Fairy in The Nutcracker, making her the first person to have danced both Marie as a child and the Sugar Plum Fairy as an adult, breaking what was referred as the "curse of Marie" in the company, which stated that no one who portrayed Marie as a child ever danced the Sugar Plum Fairy.

In 2015, she was named principal dancer. Other roles in her repertoire include Princess Aurora in The Sleeping Beauty, the Sylph in Bournonville's La Sylphide, the title role in Giselle, Alice in Wheeldon's Alice's Adventures in Wonderland, Perdita in Wheeldon's The Winter's Tale, Kylián's Petite Mort and Ratmansky's Piano Concerto #1.

In 2020, Lobsanova left the National Ballet of Canada and joined the Miami City Ballet as principal dancer.
