= Francesco Gabriele Frola =

Italian ballet dancer

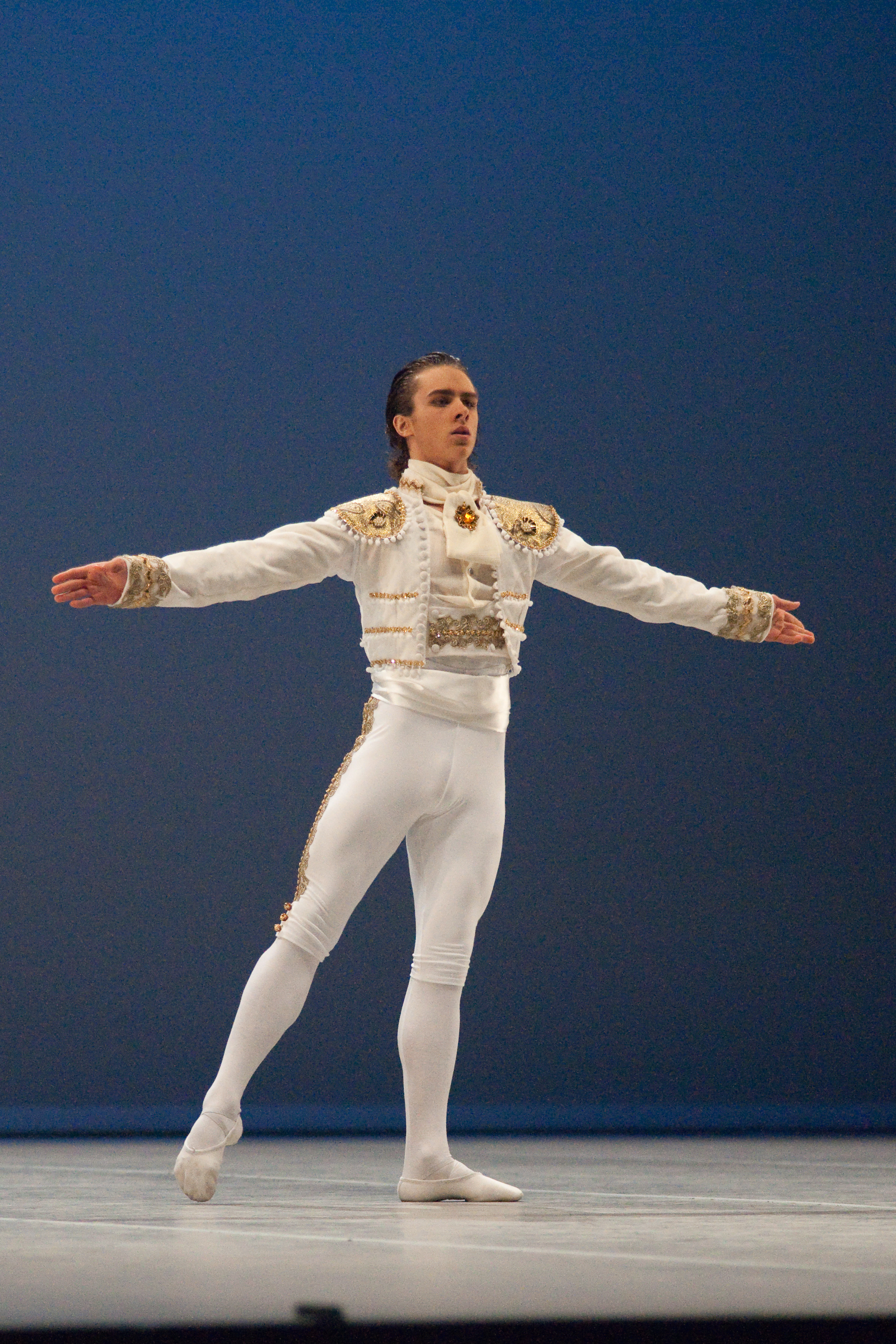
- Frola dancing a variation from Don Quixote at the Prix de Lausanne in 2010
- Born: Aosta, Italy
- Education: Professione Danza; School of The Hamburg Ballet; Fomento Artistico Cordobés
- Occupation: ballet dancer
- Years active: 2010-present
- Dancing career
- Current group: English National Ballet
- Former groups: National Ballet of Canada

Francesco Gabriele Frola (born 1992) is an Italian ballet dancer. He joined the National Ballet of Canada in 2010 and was promoted to principal dancer, the company’s highest rank, in 2018. That same year, he joined the English National Ballet as a principal dancer while retaining his position in Canada. In 2020, the English National Ballet promoted him to lead principal, and he began dancing with the company full-time.

== Early life ==
Frola was born in Aosta, to two former dancers. He started ballet at age three at his parents' school, Professione Danza in Parma. When he was 15, he competed at the Prix de Lausanne and was awarded a scholarship to The School of The Hamburg Ballet in Germany, then switched to Fomento Artistico Cordobés, Mexico, to train with a teacher who also taught his parents.

== Career ==
In 2010, Frola competed at the Prix de Lausanne again, though he did not enter the final, he was given an apprenticeship to the National Ballet of Canada, and joined the corps de ballet the following year. He was soon given soloist roles in Nijinsky and Giselle, and principal roles including the title role in Nijinsky and Lescaut in Manon. In 2015, whilst still in the corps de ballet, he was originally scheduled to dance Prince Florimund in The Sleeping Beauty with Elena Lobsanova, but when she was injured, he danced it with company star Svetlana Lunkina instead, and was promoted to first soloist the same year. In 2018, he was promoted to principal dancer, the highest rank in the company, and joined English National Ballet, while keeping his position in Canada. In 2020, ENB promoted him to lead principal dancer. The National Ballet of Canada then announced Frola would dance with ENB full-time, but intend to return as a guest artist.
