= Precious Adams =

American ballet dancer

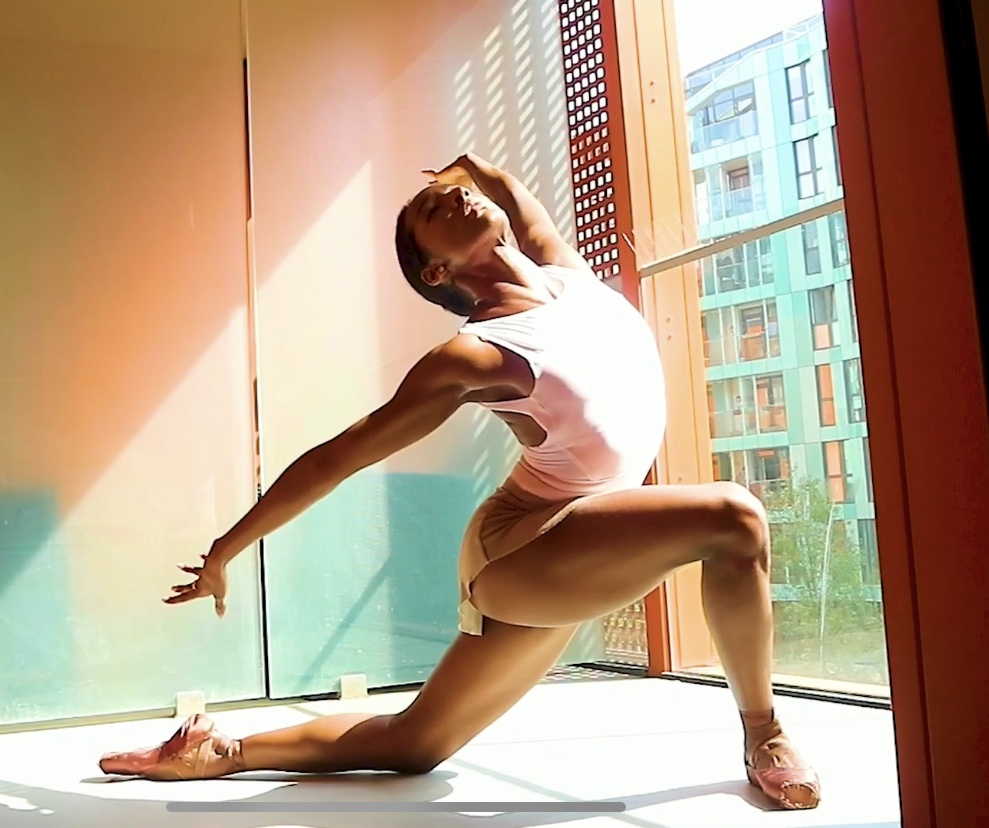
- Precious Adams dances for Swans for Relief in May 2020
- Born: 1994 or 1995 (age 31–32); Canton, Michigan, U.S.
- Education: Moscow State Academy of Choreography
- Occupation: Ballet dancer
- Dancing career
- Current group: The Australian Ballet
- Former groups: English National Ballet

Precious Adams (born 1994 or 1995) is an American ballet dancer who currently dances with The Australian Ballet.

== Early life ==
Adams was born and raised in Canton, Michigan.

== Training ==
Adams began dancing at the age of seven at a competitive jazz dance studio. She began studying classical ballet at the age of nine with Sergey Rayevskiy at the Academy of Russian Classical Ballet in Wixom, Michigan. Adams participated in three consecutive summer intensives with American Ballet Theatre, training under Brian Reeder and Franco de Vita, where she twice received the Catherine Zeta Jones Scholarship. When she was eleven years old, she went to study at the National Ballet School in Toronto under the direction of Mavis Staines. At the age of fourteen, Adams was selected to study at The Princess Grace Academy of Classical Dance in Monte Carlo under Roland Vogel and Luca Masala. In 2011, she was selected to participate in the U.S. State Department Sponsored NSLI-Y Russian language and Bolshoi Ballet Academy summer program. She studied at the Bolshoi Ballet Academy in Moscow with Natalia Igoravich Reivich and Marina Leonova. In 2012, Adams attended the Ellison Ballet summer intensive under Edward Ellison. In the summer of 2013, she performed in the sixth annual Stars of Russian Ballet Gala in Michigan. In 2014, she was a two-time prize winner at the Prix de Lausanne in Switzerland. Adams is also a Young Artist finalist and silver medalist.

=== Racial discrimination ===
While a student at the Bolshoi Ballet Academy, Adams faced discrimination due to her race including being left out of performances, being prevented from taking part in auditions, and being told to "try and rub the black off."

== Career ==
Adams was formerly a dancer with the English National Ballet. She joined the English National Ballet in 2014 and was promoted to First Artist in 2017. In January 2018, Adams won the Emerging Dancer Competition.

In 2017, Adams was invited to take part in the Kenneth MacMillan – A National Celebration at the Royal Opera House, dancing the Calliope Rag in Elite Syncopations with dancers from The Royal Ballet and Northern Ballet. She has also danced the Chosen One in Pina Bausch’s Le Sacre du printemps (The Rite of Spring), Stepsister Edwina in Christopher Wheeldon’s Cinderella and a lead sylph in La Sylphide.

In September 2018, Adams announced that she would no longer perform on stage while wearing pink tights, instead wearing brown tights to match her skin tone. She received criticism from within the ballet industry for her decision, but was supported by the director of the English National Ballet, Tamara Rojo.

Adams was named as one of the BBC 100 Women, a list of 100 inspiring and influential women from around the world, for 2019.

In 2020, Adams participated in Misty Copeland's fundraiser, Swans for Relief, by dancing The Swan, in light of the impacts of the COVID-19 coronavirus pandemic on the dance community. The fund will go to participating dancers' companies and other related relief funds. She was also promoted to junior soloist that year.

Adams was promoted to Soloist in 2022 and to First Soloist in 2024. She left English National Ballet for The Australian Ballet in January 2026, joining the latter company as a senior artist.
