= Betty Oliphant =

Canadian dance educator (1918-2004)

Betty Oliphant CC OOnt
- by Robert C. Ragsdale (fair use)
- Born: August 5, 1918; London, England
- Died: July 12, 2004 (aged 85); St. Catharines, Ontario, Canada
- Occupation: Ballet teacher
- Known for: Co-founder of the National Ballet School of Canada
- Awards: Companion of the Order of Canada; Order of Ontario

Nancy Elizabeth Oliphant CC OOnt (August 5, 1918 – July 12, 2004) was a co-founder of the National Ballet School of Canada.

== Life ==
Oliphant was born in London in 1918. Her father was a lawyer who died within weeks of her birth in a train crash. Oliphant suffered from pneumonia as a child and her doctor prescribed ballet lessons to help with her breathing. Her mother obtained lessons from a Miss Sheen who had been taught by others trained in Russia. Throughout her career Oliphant was known for following a Russian ballet style in her teaching. She studied with Tamara Karsavina, Laurent Novikoff and Marie Rambert. By the age of 17, she had opened her own school having decided that she was too tall to be top dancer herself.

She moved to Canada in 1947. In 1951, she became ballet mistress for the National Ballet of Canada at the request of Celia Franca, the company's director. She and Franca founded the National Ballet School of Canada in 1959. Alumni include Frank Augustyn, Rex Harrington, Karen Kain, John Alleyne, James Kudelka and Veronica Tennant. She had been trained in the Cecchetti method of classical dance.

In 1959, she became associate artistic director for the National Ballet of Canada, but resigned in 1975 to devote herself to the school. She retired in 1989.

She was known for her strict manner, high standards and insistence on technique. She wrote an auto biography where she recounted her difficult private life consoled by her career success.

She was appointed an Officer of the Order of Canada (OC) in 1972, "in recognition of her leadership and her service as teacher and administrator of the National Ballet School", and promoted to a Companion of the Order (CC) in 1985. In 1988, the National Ballet School of Canada named its new performance space the Betty Oliphant Theatre. In 1996, she published an autobiography Miss O: My Life in Dance (ISBN 0-88801-210-1). She was appointed a Member of the Order of Ontario (OOnt) in 2000.

She died in St. Catharines, Ontario at the age of 85.
