= Kimberly Glasco =

Canadian ballerina (born 1960)

Kimberly Glasco (born November 27, 1960, in Eugene, Oregon) is a Canadian ballerina. She danced with the National Ballet of Canada until she was dismissed by artistic director James Kudelka. She filed a wrongful dismissal suit against the company which was reportedly settled out of court for $1.6 million.

== National Ballet of Canada ==
Glasco danced at the company for 22 years, including lead roles in Manon and La Bayadère. She also served on the board as one of two dancers' representatives.

== Wrongful Dismissal Suit ==
In 1998, Glasco filed a wrongful dismissal suit against the National Ballet of Canada instigated because artistic director James Kudelka dropped her from the company roster, allegedly because Glasco had questioned the allocation of funds for Kudelka's version of Swan Lake. She said that Kudelka told her he was letting her go because she had opposed his plans to spend $1.6 million on the new production and because she had opposed his appointment as artistic director. At the time, the National was nearly $3 million in debt. Glasco also filed complaints with Ontario's Labour Relations Board and Human Rights Commission.

Kudelka maintained that her contract was not renewed for artistic and financial reasons. He alleged that her dancing was not as strong as it had been and that her dismissal was part of a larger strategy to expand the size of the ballet when cutbacks had reduced its budget from $16 million to $14 million. The company's founder Celia Franca and executive director Valerie Wilder spoke out in support of the artistic director. Glasco had the support of former National star Vanessa Harwood, Canadian Auto Workers boss Buzz Hargrove, Dr. Nancy Olivieri and Betty Oliphant.

On March 18, 1999, the National agreed to meet Glasco for private mediation which replaced both the Labour Relations complaint and lawsuit. The case was reportedly settled for $1.6 million in Glasco's favour. Kudelka remained as artistic director until 2005 when he was replaced by Karen Kain.
