= Rex Harrington =

Greek-Canadian ballet dancer

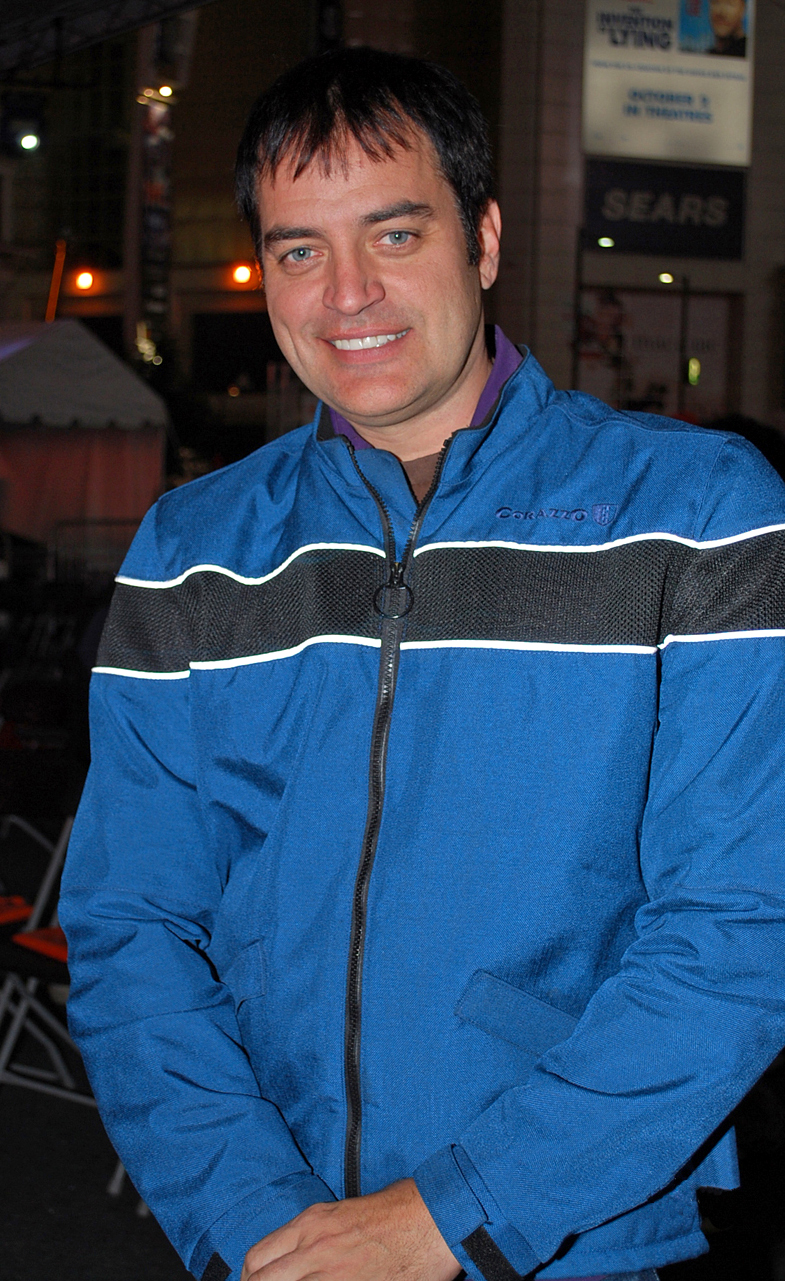
- Harrington in 2009
- Born: Rex Howard Harrington; October 30, 1962 (age 63); Peterborough, Ontario, Canada
- Career
- Former groups: National Ballet of Canada
- Dances: Ballet

Rex Howard Harrington, OC FRSC (born October 30, 1962, in Peterborough, Ontario) is a Canadian ballet dancer. In 2000, he was made an Officer of the Order of Canada. In 2005, he was inducted into Canada's Walk of Fame. In 2006, he was awarded an honorary doctorate by York University and was made a Fellow of the Royal Society of Canada. He is currently artist-in-residence at the National Ballet of Canada, and is a board member of the Dancer Transition Resource Centre.

== Dance career ==
Harrington studied at Canada's National Ballet School. He joined the National Ballet of Canada in 1983 and became a principal dancer in 1988. He partnered with many renowned ballerinas such as Ekaterina Maximova, Carla Fracci, Karen Kain, Veronica Tennant, Alessandra Ferri, Susan Jaffe and Evelyn Hart. He has also performed with such companies as La Scala Theatre Ballet, San Francisco Ballet, Royal Winnipeg Ballet, and Stuttgart Ballet. Harrington's classical roles include Romeo in Romeo and Juliet, Basilio in Don Quixote, Kastchei in The Firebird, Eugene Onegin in Onegin, and Apollo in Balanchine's Apollo. James Kudelka created several roles for Harrington, including Rothbart in Swan Lake (1999), Peter/The Nutcracker in The Nutcracker (1995), and the central role in The Four Seasons (1997). Choreographer Glen Tetley also created the roles of Lewis Carroll in Alice (1992) and The Young Gentleman in La Ronde (1988) for Harrington.

Harrington retired from the stage in 2004, although he came out of retirement to dance the role of Prince Gremin in the National Ballet of Canada's 2010 production of Onegin.

== Film, television and theatre ==
Harrington has appeared in Norman Jewison's The January Man, as well as the film adaptation of The Four Seasons, for which he won a Gemini Award in 2000. Harrington's television credits include the CBC Television specials Karen Kain: Dancing in the Moment and Wild Hearts in Strange Times, featuring dance artist Margie Gillis. In 2002, Harrington made his musical theatre debut in Robin Hood at Toronto's Winter Garden Theatre.

In 2004, he had a guest role in an episode of Queer as Folk.

Harrington was also a recurring guest judge on So You Think You Can Dance Canada. In summer 2014, Rex appeared as a contestant with his fiancé, Bob Hope, on the second season of The Amazing Race Canada, where he finished 7th.

== Advocacy ==
Harrington's mother, who first encouraged him to dance, has schizophrenia. He has spoken out against the stigma attached to mental illness, most notably through the "Transforming Lives" campaign of the Centre for Addiction and Mental Health in Toronto.
