= Teresa Mann =

Panamanian ballerina (b. 1934, d. 2017)

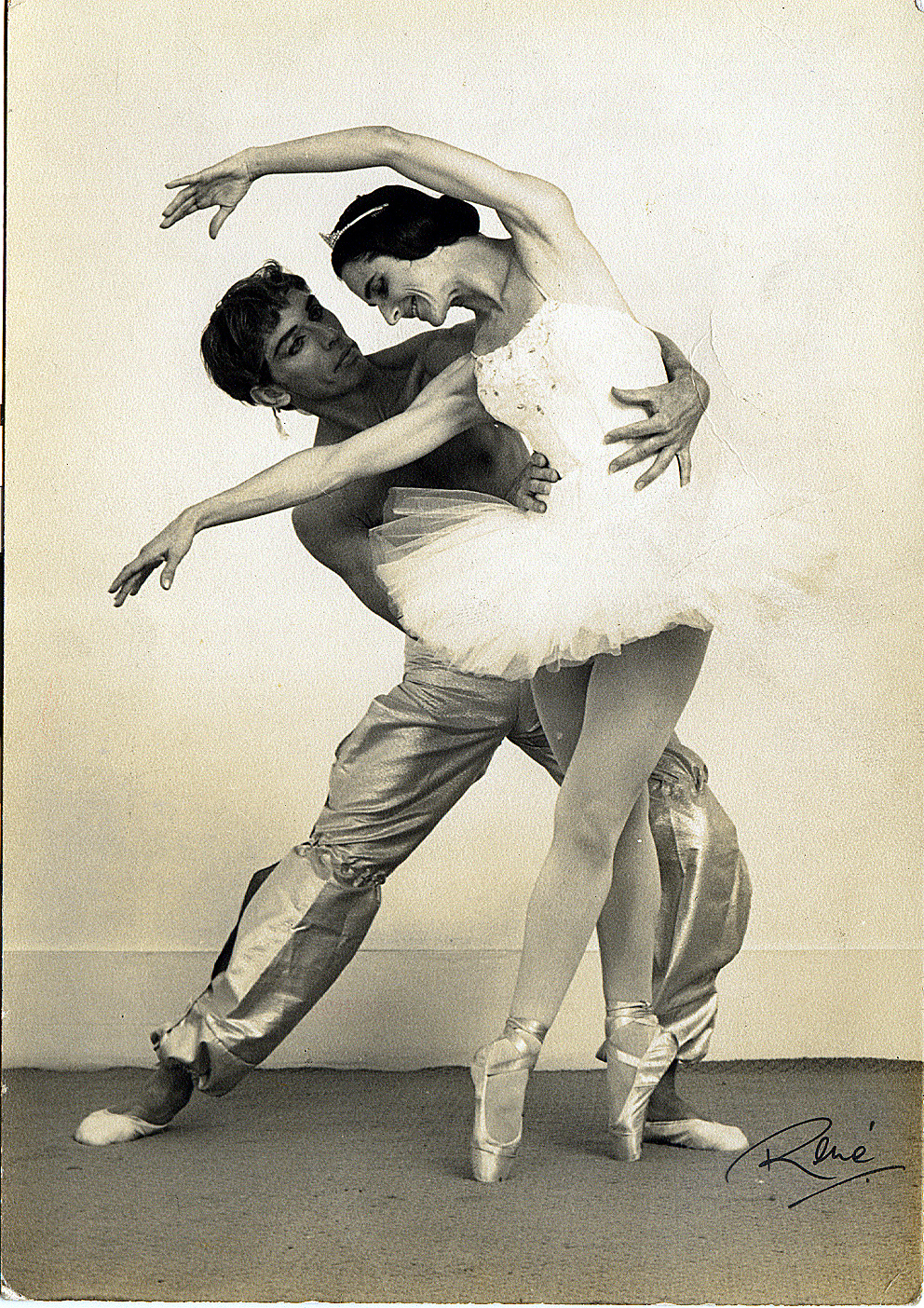
- Still of Mann with Earl Kraul from La Bayadère
- Born: Doris Teresa Mann de Obarrio; September 2, 1934; Panama City, Panama
- Died: July 6, 2017 (aged 82)
- Occupation: Ballerina
- Known for: Founding the Ballet Nacional de Panama

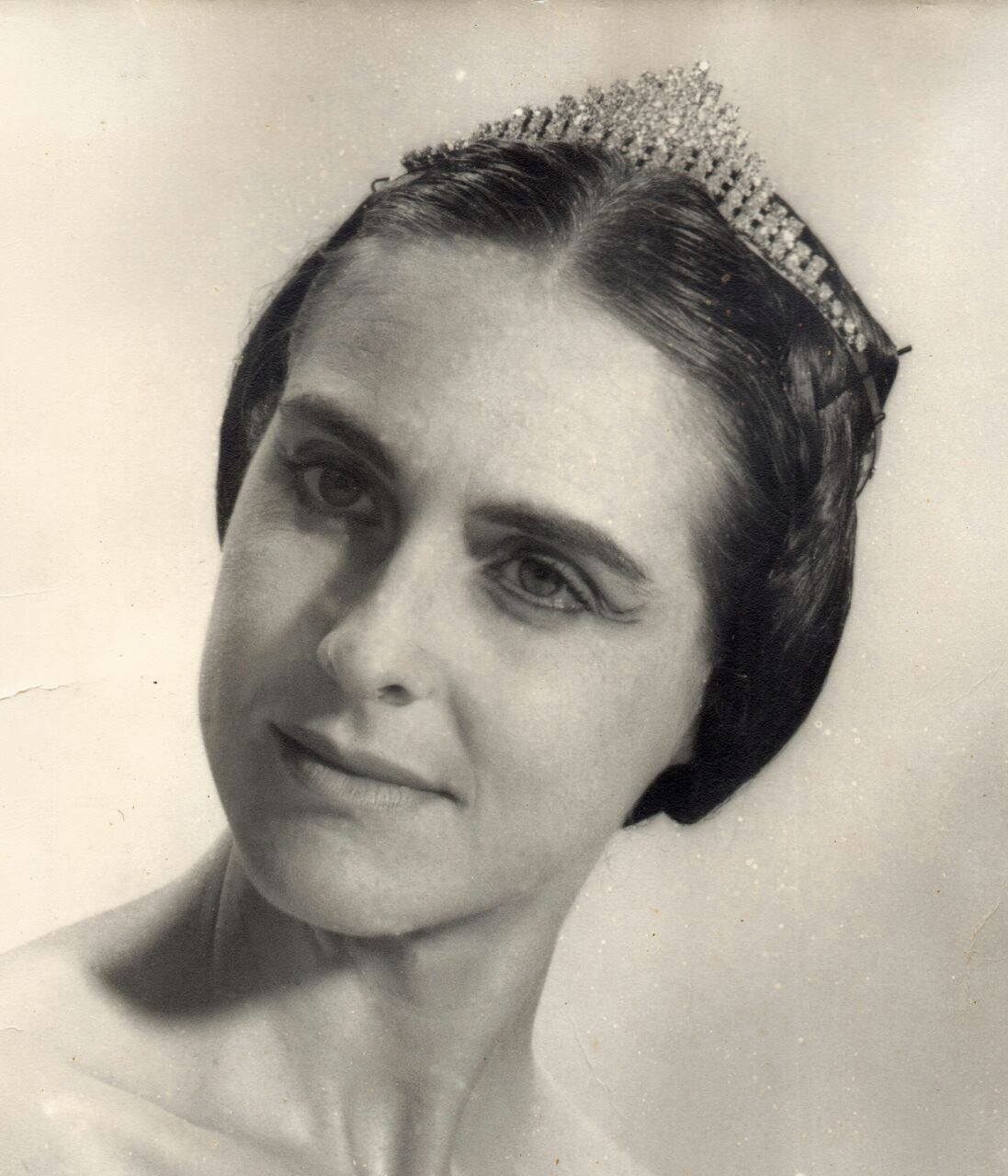

Teresa Mann (2 September 1934 in Panama City, Panama – 6 July 2017) was a Panamanian ballerina, ballet teacher and dance pioneer. She was a founding member of the Ballet Nacional de Panama and its lead dancer until 1983. She was also the founding director of the Escuela de Danzas Teresa Mann and the Ballet de Teresa Mann in Panama.

== Early life (1934–1951) ==
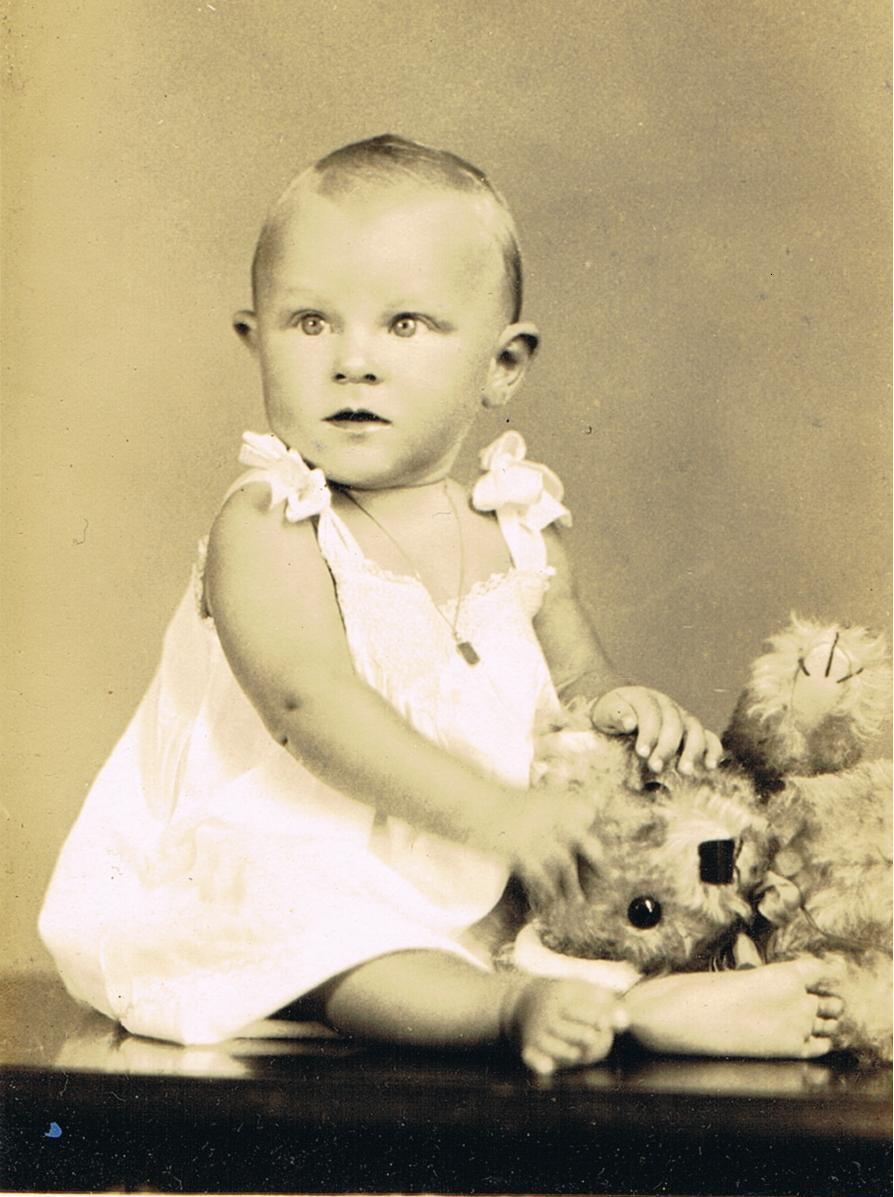
Teresa Mann, age 1.

Mann was born in Panama City, Panama on September 2, 1934. Her father was a Canadian and a banker, Henry Lindsay Mann, who had been sent to Panama while working for the Royal Bank of Canada. Her mother was a Panamanian, Rosaura de Obarrio, daughter of engineer, Alberto de Obarrio. Shortly after Mann's birth, the family returned to Caracas, Venezuela.

Mann began her pre-ballet studies in Caracas with Stephy Stahl. A few years later, the family moved to Lima, Peru. There, Mann initiated her formal classical ballet studies with Kaye McKinnon and Dimitri Rostoff. She graduated from the Escuela Oficial del Ballet Peruano and danced professionally with the Ballet Peruano under the direction of McKinnon.

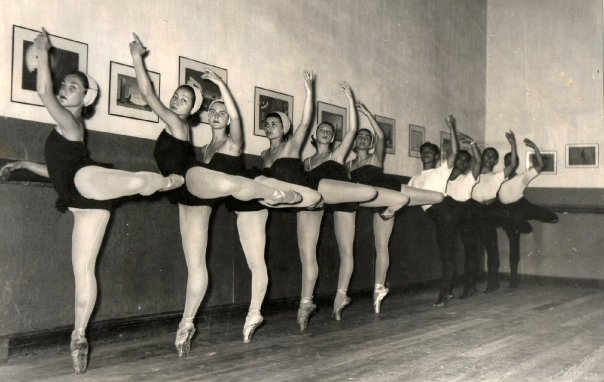
Mann is the third from the left.

The Mann family returned to Panama in 1946 where Mann attended and graduated from the Maria Inmaculada International School. She studied ballet with Anna Ludmilla Gee and was a founding student of the National Ballet School of Panama. Around this time, she returned briefly to Peru where she danced with the Ballet Peruano.

== Early career (1951–63) ==
Mann received a Bachelor of Arts from Holy Names College in Oakland, California. While there, she studied ballet with Sybil Marion and Guillermo Del Oro, then with Margaret Crazke and Antony Tudor in New York City.

In 1956 she was hired by the National Ballet of Canada, under the direction of Celia Franca. Two years later, at 21 years old, she was interviewed by the Catholic Register in Toronto. In that interview she said, "[All] I ever had was the will inside me to keep trying. I was all wrong for ballet but I’ve been just stubborn enough to continue through all odds and adversity. I even changed the shape of my body through exercise."

In the same interview she also said that “the Hand of God directed me to this very fine company where, I feel I contribute something, in a small way. Ballet is one of the finest of the arts and I want to give my talent given to me by God as a contribution to the world.”

While on an NBC tour to California in 1958, she wrote a letter that was published in the Holy Names College Alumni Bulletin: "Finally I have achieved that peace of soul which comes from knowing that this is my mission in life." Teresa Mann was with the National Ballet of Canada for five years, until 1961. She then moved to London, England for two years, where she trained with Audrey De Vos and danced with various companies in Europe.

== National Ballet of Panama (1963–83) ==
Mann returned to Panama in 1963 and was instrumental in the formation of the first ballet company in the country in 1972, the Ballet Nacional de Panama.

Five years later, Mann, together with Panamanian dancers, Ileana de Sola, Otilia Tejeira, Nitzia Cucalón de Martín, Armando Villamil, among others, created a group called Ballet Concierto de Panama, under the direction of Francoise Adret. The company then became the Ballet Concierto Universitario after the creation of a Department of Artistic Expressions (DEXA) at the University of Panama.

In the National Ballet of Panama's debut 1972 performance, La Bayadère, the principal dancers were Mann, Ginela Vazquez, Armando Villamil, Nitzia Cucalon, Raisa Gutierrez and Alejandro Lugo. Mann was lead dancer (prima ballerina) for the National Ballet until 1983 when she left the company to focus on her Escuela de Danzas Teresa Mann and Ballet de Teresa Mann, which she founded in 1965 and 1975, respectively.

== Roles and partners ==
Shortly after the creation of the Ballet Universitario, Mann invited her old friend Earl Kraul from the National Ballet of Canada, to come to Panama as a guest artist. In Panama, Mann also danced with Armando Villamil, Alejandro Lugo, Andres Nieto and most notably, with Julio Araúz.

Her notable mentions with the National Ballet include: Black Swan, Grand Pas Classique, Grand Pas de Deux from the Nutcracker, Le Corsaire, Les Sylphides, Pas de Quatre, The Dying Swan, Nikiya in La Bayadère, Nymph in Walpurgis Nights, El Diablo in La Flor del Diablo, and Pena y Consuelo, Romance and Titania in Midsummer Night's Dream.

== Further studies ==
In 1976, Mann received her Master of Science in Ballet from the Music School of the University of Indiana in Bloomington, Indiana. Mann also studied Spanish and Ethnic Dancing, Character, Modern, Jazz, Yoga, Drama, Lighting and Music, including 12 years of piano.

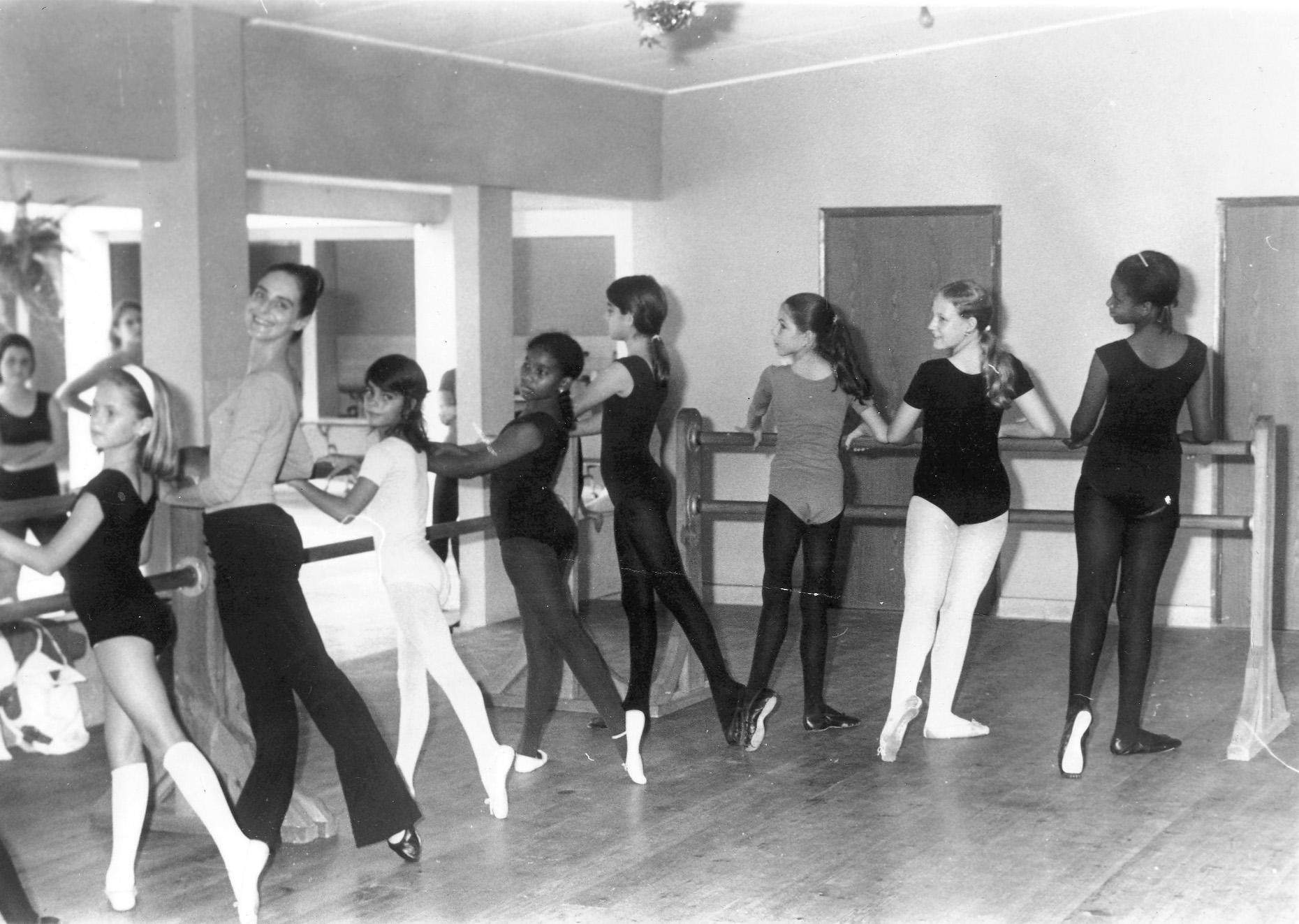
Mann and her first students in 1964.

In 1981 she joined the Dance Educators of America and was invited numerous times as a guest teacher for master classes.

During her time as director of the Teresa Mann School of Dance, Mann constantly took her students to dance seminars, congresses, festivals and competitions, where they received numerous awards. In 1984 she began taking her students to dance competitions in Lima, Peru. She was a major supporter of the Certamen Infantil Juvenil de Ballet de Centroamerica, Mexico y Panama and was a guest teacher ag many festivals including the third Festival de Ballet Infantil Juvenil in Guadalajara, Mexico in 2008.

== Awards ==
In 1996 Mann received an Galardon Atenea award in the arts category from Panama's Club de Mujeres y Negocios y Profesionales de Chanis. On the 35th anniversary of her dance school in 2000, she received the Condecoración Nacional de la Orden Manuel Amador Guerrero en Grado de Gran Oficial, the highest honor in Panama, for her contribution to the development of Panamanian culture. Her message to future generations that evening was, "We cannot accept the possibility of our inability to do nothing."

That year also, Mann received the Placa de Honor from the Dirección Nacional de la Mujer por el Ministerio de la Juventud, la Mujer, la Niñez y la Familia (Ministry of Youth, Women, Children and Family) and a Recognition from City Hall in Panama City (Pergamino de Reconocimiento por la Alcaldía del Distrito Capital).

Four years later, in celebration of the country's centenary, she was selected as one of the 100 Distinguished Women of Panama by the Faculty of Humanities of the National University of Panama and is one of the 100 Panamanian women recognized and celebrated in its publication. The article quotes her as saying, that "art is achieved through disciplined concentration and a loving giving (of self)."

In 2008 she received the Estrella Emerita award from Panama's Premios Anita Villalaz, given to distinguished personalities. On that occasion Mann shared her philosophy of life: "Even though the world is so fast-paced, we have to forget that phrase, as I did: "I can't". That word does not exist in my vocabulary." That same year she was a guest on the FETV program, Gente Interesante on Channel 5.

In 2009, during the celebration of the International Day of Dance, she received a plaque from the Panamanian Instituto Nacional de Cultura in recognition of her contributions to dance and ballet in the country and her continued contribution and support of the cultural development of Panama. Finally in 2015, she received the Education in the Arts Musicalion award for her work as a dance educator in Panama.

== Personal life ==
In 1964, Mann married Carlos Emilio Guevara Céspedes. Together they had three children, Carlos, Myriam and Pedro. In 2008 she retired formally as director of her school and her daughter, Myriam Guevara, became its new director. Teresa Mann died in Panama City on July 6, 2017.

== Legacy ==
Thousands of Panamanian women have studied ballet under Teresa Mann and have danced at her school since 1965. Most of the owners of other dance schools in Panama today are graduates of the Escuela de Danzas Teresa Mann (EDTM).

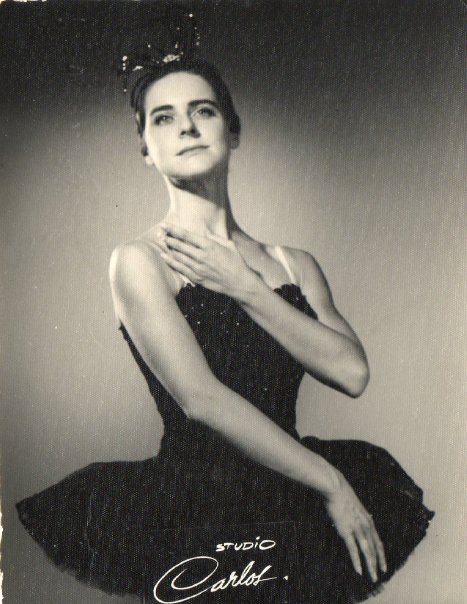
Mann as the Black Swan.

Teresa Mann said once during an interview with the newspaper Panama America that discipline was very important for her. "Competition medals were of secondary importance for her, what's really valuable is the experience, the training, discipline and the mastering of that discipline, and concentration; benefits that they will keep for life," that same interview said of her. She added: "Most of these girls will not be professional dancers, but they would have learned to organize their time and widen their horizons." The EDTM continues the legacy that Mann started in 1965.
