= Svetlana Lunkina =

Russian ballerina (born 1979)

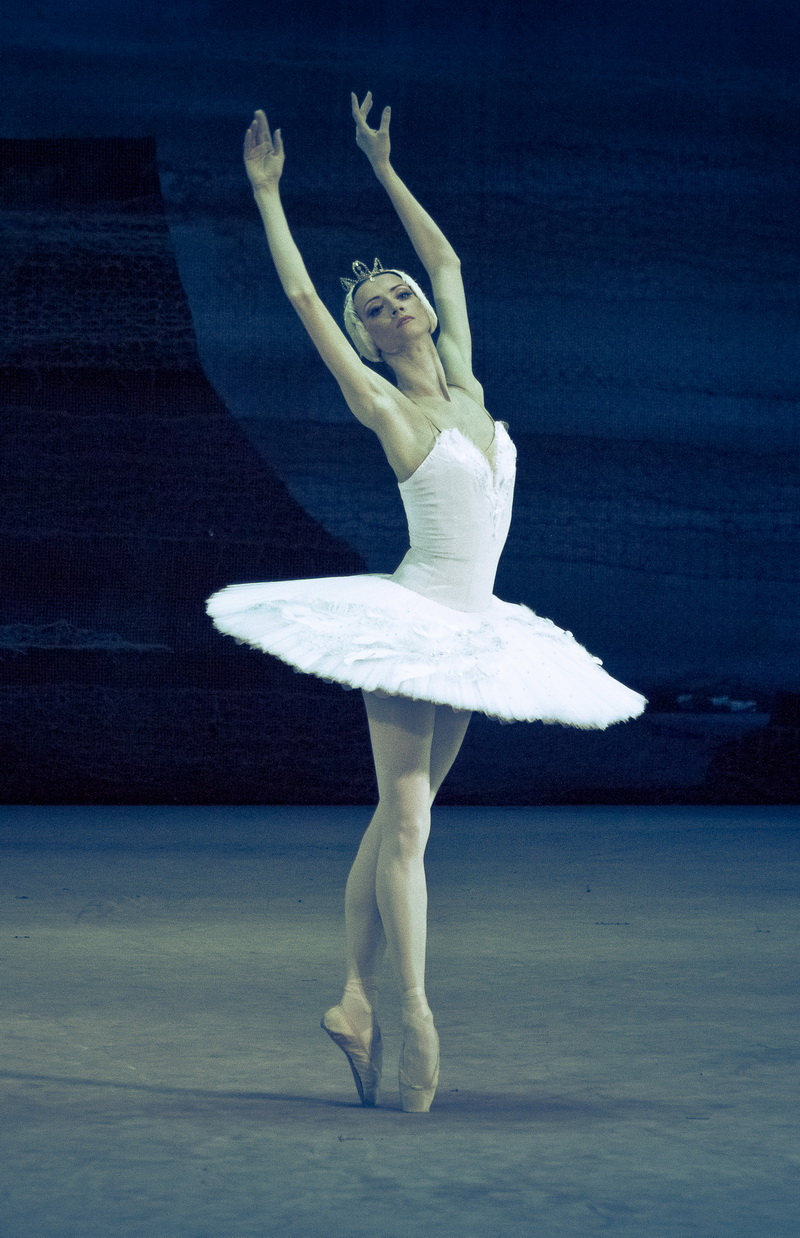
- Lunkina as Odette in Swan Lake, Bolshoi Theatre, 2011
- Born: Светла́на Алекса́ндровна Лу́нькина; 29 July 1979 (age 47); Moscow, Russian SFSR, Soviet Union (now Russian Federation)
- Education: Moscow State Academy of Choreography
- Occupation: Ballerina
- Employer(s): Bolshoi Theatre; National Ballet of Canada
- Known for: Giselle, Swan Lake
- Spouse: Vladislav Moskalev
- Children: 2
- Awards: Meritorious Artist of Russia (2008); Prix Benois de la Danse (2007)
- Website: svetlanalunkina.com

Svetlana Aleksandrovna Lunkina (Russian: Светла́на Алекса́ндровна Лу́нькина; born 29 July 1979) is a Russian-Canadian ballerina who is a principal dancer with the National Ballet of Canada.

== Biography ==
Lunkina was born in Moscow and attended the Moscow Choreographic Academy. Upon her graduation in 1997, she joined the Bolshoi Ballet, where she worked under the tutelage of Ekaterina Maximova. During her first season at the Bolshoi Theatre, she was chosen to perform the title role in Giselle and thus, at the age of 18, became the youngest Giselle in the history of the Bolshoi.

Over her 15-year career with the company, Lunkina danced many leading roles in both classical and contemporary ballets. In 2001, she was a Triumph Youth Award recipient, and the following year, Alexander Grant cast her as Lise in the Bolshoi premiere of Frederick Ashton's La Fille mal gardée. Later, she worked extensively with Roland Petit, who gave her the roles of Liza in La Dame de Pique and Esmeralda in Notre-Dame de Paris in their Bolshoi premieres. She also performed La Rose Malade, which Petit updated for Lunkina for the first time since Maya Plisetskaya danced it. She was promoted to the rank of principal dancer in 2005. That year, Lunkina was awarded the Brilliance of the 21st Century award. During her career, she has performed in such ballets as La Bayadère, The Sleeping Beauty, La Fille du Pharaon, Spartacus and Chroma, and appeared at such theatres as the Berlin and Bavarian State Operas, the Teatro dell'Opera di Roma and with the National Ballet of Japan, among others. In 2006, she appeared as Giselle at the Vienna State Opera opposite Vladimir Malakhov. In 2007, she performed with the Paris Opera Ballet as Lise in Ashton's La Fille mal gardée, opposite Mathieu Ganio, and as Clara in Rudolf Nureyev's The Nutcracker, opposite Jérémie Bélingard. That year, Lunkina was awarded the Prix Benois de la Danse, sharing the prize for best female dancer with Agnès Letestu. In 2008, Lunkina received the title Meritorious Artist of Russia. In 2010, she was awarded with the prize Ballerina of the Decade, along with the three other well-known ballerinas: Diana Vishneva, Alina Cojocaru and Lucia Lacarra.

Lunkina joined the National Ballet of Canada as a principal guest artist in August 2013 and as a permanent principal dancer the following year. With the company her repertoire has expanded to include roles such as Tatiana in John Cranko's Onegin and several ballets choreographed by John Neumeier: as Romola de Pulszky in Nijinsky, Blanche DuBois in A Streetcar Named Desire and the title role in Anna Karenina, which she danced in the company premiere. Having first worked with Christopher Wheeldon during the world premiere of his Misericordes at the Bolshoi in 2007, Lunkina has since performed in his Alice's Adventures in Wonderland as the Queen of Hearts, as Paulina in The Winter's Tale and in his After the Rain with the National Ballet of Canada. She had danced in the Bolshoi premiere of Wayne McGregor's Chroma in 2011 and subsequently reprised that role with the National Ballet, as well as performing in his Genus and as Oryx in MADDADDAM. In addition she has performed multiple ballets by George Balanchine, Kenneth MacMillan, James Kudelka, Alexei Ratmansky and Crystal Pite, including her Emergence and Angels' Atlas. With the National Ballet she has also performed the title roles in La Sylphide and Giselle, in two productions of Swan Lake as Odette-Odile, as Princess Aurora in The Sleeping Beauty and as both the Snow Queen and Sugar Plum Fairy in The Nutcracker.

Lunkina has also continued to appear as a guest artist. In March 2014, she performed Petit's Le Jeune homme et la Mort at the London Coliseum. That year, she was invited as a guest artist in South Korea, and in April 2015, she performed in Taiwan, returning again in August 2017 and October 2025. In 2016 and 2018, she performed with the Asami Maki Ballet Tokyo, starring in Swan Lake and Asami Maki's Asuka. In October 2018, she performed in Singapore. In May 2019, she danced the title role in Neumeier's Anna Karenina with the Hamburg Ballet.

In 2002, Lunkina played one of the main characters in the feature film Petersburg-Cannes Express (Russian: Экспресс Петербург-Канны), by the American director John Daly; the world premiere screening took place in 2003 in Palm Springs, California. In 2004, the Japanese portrait photographer Eichiro Sakata, included Lunkina in his photo gallery called Piercing the Sky as an outstanding contemporary personality. In 2013, Lunkina became the main attraction and the objet d'art of a European art exhibit, created by the artist Anna Gaskell.

On 18 March 2014, Lunkina publicly expressed solidarity with the Ukrainian people following Russia's occupation of Crimea. In response to the Russian occupation of eastern Ukraine, she gave a charity performance of Giselle at the Odesa Opera and Ballet Theater in October 2015. In September 2016, she returned there to dance Odette-Odile in Swan Lake. In April 2022, she performed at a benefit gala in Toronto for Ukrainian war relief. She has also provided material assistance to the Armed Forces of Ukraine.

Lunkina is the artistic director of the Canada All Star Ballet Gala. Its first performance took place on 11 February 2017 at the Sony Centre for the Performing Arts in Toronto, featuring principal dancers from American Ballet Theatre, the Bolshoi Ballet, Rome Opera Ballet, Royal Ballet, Royal Danish Ballet, San Francisco Ballet, Stuttgart Ballet and the National Ballet of Canada.

In 2019, collaborating with scientists and programmers, Lunkina developed the 1on1 Ballet Studio app, an interactive training program designed to develop ballet technique and proper form, which uses AI to analyze execution and offer suggestions on how to improve ballet technique.

== Personal life ==
Lunkina is married to Ukrainian-born producer Vladislav Moskalev and has two children: Maxim, born in January 2004, and Eva, born in April 2009.

== Repertoire ==
- La Sylphide (choreography by Elsa-Marianne von Rosen, after August Bournonville): Sylph
- La Sylphide (choreography by Johan Kobborg, after August Bournonville): Sylph
- Giselle (choreography by Vladimir Vasiliev, after Jean Coralli and Jules Perrot): Giselle
- Giselle (choreography by Yuri Grigorovich, after Jean Coralli and Jules Perrot): Giselle
- Giselle (choreography by Patrice Bart, after Jean Coralli and Jules Perrot): Giselle
- Giselle (choreography by Konstantin Sergeyev, after Jean Coralli and Jules Perrot): Giselle
- Giselle (choreography by Carla Fracci, after Jean Coralli and Jules Perrot): Giselle
- Giselle (choreography by Elena Tchernichova, after Jean Coralli and Jules Perrot): Giselle
- Giselle (choreography by Sergei Vikharev, after Jean Coralli and Jules Perrot): Giselle
- Giselle (choreography by Nadia Fedorova, after Jean Coralli and Jules Perrot): Giselle
- Giselle (choreography by Peter Wright, after Jean Coralli and Jules Perrot): Giselle
- Don Quixote (choreography by Alexei Fadeyechev, after Marius Petipa and Alexander Gorsky): Kitri
- La Bayadère (choreography by Yuri Grigorovich, after Marius Petipa): Nikiya, D'Jampe
- Swan Lake (choreography by Yuri Grigorovich, after Marius Petipa and Lev Ivanov): Odette-Odile, Russian Bride
- Swan Lake (choreography by Dimitrije Parlić, after Marius Petipa and Lev Ivanov): Odette-Odile
- Swan Lake choreography by Galina Samsova, after Marius Petitpa and Lev Ivanov): Odette-Odile
- Swan Lake (choreography by Ray Barra, after Marius Petipa and Lev Ivanov): Odette-Odile
- Swan Lake (choreography by Gheorghe Iancu, after Marius Petipa and Lev Ivanov): Odette-Odile
- Swan Lake (choreography by James Kudelka, after Marius Petipa and Lev Ivanov): Odette-Odile
- Swan Lake (choreography by Kyozo Mitani and Terry Westmoreland, after Marius Petipa and Lev Ivanov): Odette-Odile
- Swan Lake (choreography by Yuri Vasyuchenko, after Marius Petipa and Lev Ivanov): Odette-Odile
- Swan Lake (produced by Karen Kain, after Marius Petipa and Lev Ivanov, with additional choreography by Erik Bruhn, Robert Binet and Christopher Stowell): Odette-Odile
- The Sleeping Beauty (choreography by Yuri Grigorovich, after Marius Petipa): Princess Aurora, Fairy of Tenderness, Silver Fairy
- The Sleeping Beauty (choreography by Rudolf Nureyev, after Marius Petipa): Princess Aurora
- The Nutcracker (choreography by Vasily Vainonen): Masha
- The Nutcracker (choreography by Yuri Grigorovich): Marie
- The Nutcracker (choreography by Rudolf Nureyev): Clara
- The Nutcracker (choreography by James Kudelka): Sugar Plum Fairy, Snow Queen
- The Nutcracker (choreography by Hulda Bittencourt): Snow Queen/Sugar Plum Fairy
- Raymonda (choreography by Yuri Grigorovich, after Marius Petipa): Clémence
- Raymonda (choreography by Carla Fracci, after Marius Petipa): Raymonda
- Le Corsaire (choreography by Alexei Ratmansky and Yuri Burlaka, after Marius Petipa): Medora
- Esmeralda (choreography by Yuri Burlaka and Vasily Medvedev, after Marius Petipa): Esmeralda
- La Fille mal gardée (choreography by Frederick Ashton): Lise (first interpreter at the Bolshoi)
- La Fille du Pharaon (choreography by Pierre Lacotte, after Marius Petipa): Aspicia
- Notre-Dame de Paris (choreography by Roland Petit): Esmeralda (first interpreter at the Bolshoi)
- Spartacus (choreography by Yuri Grigorovich): Phrygia
- Anyuta (choreography by Vladimir Vasiliev): Anyuta
- Asuka (choreography by Asami Maki): Sugaru-Otome
- Romeo and Juliet (choreography by John Cranko): Lady Capulet
- Onegin (choreography by John Cranko): Tatiana
- Manon (choreography by Kenneth MacMillan): Lescaut's Mistress
- Nijinsky (choreography by John Neumeier): Romola de Pulszky, Eleonora Bereda
- A Streetcar Named Desire (choreography by John Neumeier): Blanche DuBois
- Anna Karenina (choreography: John Neumeier): Anna Karenina (first interpreter at the National Ballet of Canada)
- The Bright Stream (choreography by Alexei Ratmansky): Zina
- Illusions perdues (choreography by Alexei Ratmansky): Coralie
- Romeo and Juliet (choreography by Alexei Ratmansky): Juliet
- Alice's Adventures in Wonderland (choreography by Christopher Wheeldon): Alice's Mother/Queen of Hearts
- The Winter's Tale (choreography by Christopher Wheeldon): Paulina
- Le Petit Prince (choreography by Guillaume Côté): The Snake
- MADDADDAM (choreography by Wayne McGregor): Oryx
- Le Jeune Homme et la Mort (choreography by Roland Petit): la Mort
- La Dame de Pique (choreography by Roland Petit): Liza (first interpreter at the Bolshoi)
- Carmen Suite (choreography by Alberto Alonso): Carmen
- The Lesson (choreography by Flemming Flindt): Pupil
- Les Sylphides (called Chopiniana in the Bolshoi production, choreography by Michel Fokine): Prelude and 7th Waltz
- Le Spectre de la Rose (choreography by Michel Fokine)
- The Dying Swan (choreography by Michel Fokine)
- Gaîté Parisienne (choreography by Léonide Massine): Glove Seller (first interpreter at the Bolshoi)
- Les Présages (choreography by Léonide Massine): Passion
- Apollo (choreography by George Balanchine): Terpsichore
- Serenade (choreography by George Balanchine): Waltz Girl
- Symphony in C (choreography by George Balanchine): First Movement, Second Movement
- The Four Temperaments (choreography by George Balanchine): Sanguinic
- Jewels (choreography by George Balanchine): "Emeralds", "Diamonds"
- Pas de Quatre (choreography by Anton Dolin): Carlotta Grisi
- Suite en Blanc (choreography by Serge Lifar): La Cigarette, Adage (first interpreter at the National Ballet of Canada), La Flûte (first interpreter at the National Ballet of Canada)
- The Leaves Are Fading (choreography by Antony Tudor): third duet
- Afternoon of a Faun (choreography by Jerome Robbins): Young Girl (first interpreter at the Bolshoi)
- La Rose Malade (choreography by Roland Petit)
- Passacaille (choreography by Roland Petit): soloist (first interpreter at the Bolshoi)
- Concerto (choreography by Kenneth MacMillan): Second Movement
- Elite Syncopations (choreography by Kenneth MacMillan): Stop-Time Rag
- Sentimental Waltz (choreography by Vladimir Vasiliev)
- Petite Mort (choreography by Jiří Kylián)
- Approximate Sonata 2016 (choreography by William Forsythe; first interpreter at the National Ballet of Canada)
- The Collective Agreement (choreography by Alonzo King)
- Jeu de cartes (choreography by Alexei Ratmansky)
- Piano Concerto no. 1 (choreography by Alexei Ratmansky; first interpreter at the National Ballet of Canada)
- After the Rain (choreography by Christopher Wheeldon): Third Couple
- Misericordes (choreography by Christopher Wheeldon; world premiere)
- Chroma (choreography by Wayne McGregor; first interpreter at the Bolshoi)
- Genus (choreography by Wayne McGregor)
- Dream of Dream (choreography by Jorma Elo; world premiere)
- …black night's bright day (choreography by James Kudelka; world premiere)
- Passion (choreography by James Kudelka): Contemporary Woman (first interpreter at the National Ballet of Canada)
- Emergence (choreography by Crystal Pite)
- Angels' Atlas (choreography by Crystal Pite)
- Watch her (choreography by Aszure Barton)
- Unearth (choreography by Robert Binet)
- The Dreamers Ever Leave You (choreography by Robert Binet)
- Orpheus Alive (choreography by Robert Binet): Final Apparition (world premiere)
- Being and Nothingness (choreography by Guillaume Côté; world premiere)
- Dark Angels (choreography by Guillaume Côté; world premiere)
- On Solid Ground (choreography by Siphesihle November; world premiere)
- Distorted Familiarity (choreography by Katlyn Addison; world premiere)

== Filmography ==
- Giselle (choreography by Vladimir Vasiliev), with Nikolay Tsiskaridze, Maria Alexandrova, Bolshoi Theatre, 1998
- Anyuta (choreography by Vladimir Vasiliev), with Vladimir Vasiliev, Alexander Petukhov, Alexander Popovchenko, Dmitri Rykhlov, Bolshoi Ballet, 1999
- Notre-Dame de Paris (choreography by Roland Petit), with Nikolay Tsiskaridze, Bolshoi Theatre, 2003
- La Dame de Pique (choreography by Roland Petit), with Nikolay Tsiskaridze, Ilze Liepa, Bolshoi Theatre, 2005
- Passacaille (choreography by Roland Petit), Bolshoi Theatre, 2005
- Strictly Bolshoi (documentary includes a complete performance of Christopher Wheeldon's Misericordes), 2007
- Giselle (choreography by Yuri Grigorovich), with Dmitry Gudanov, Maria Allash, Bolshoi Theatre, 2011
- Le Corsaire (choreography by Alexei Ratmansky and Yuri Burlaka after Marius Petipa), with Ruslan Skvortsov, Bolshoi Theatre, 2012
- The Bright Stream (choreography by Alexei Ratmansky), with Mikhail Lobukhin, Maria Alexandrova, Ruslan Skvortsov, Bolshoi Theatre, 2012
- Apollo (choreography by George Balanchine), with Brendan Saye, Jeannine Haller, Calley Skalnik, National Ballet of Canada, 2021

== See also ==
- List of Russian ballet dancers
