= Siphesihle November =

South African ballet dancer

- Born: 1998 or 1999 (age 27–28); Zolani, South Africa
- Education: Canada's National Ballet School
- Occupation: Ballet dancer
- Height: 5 ft 7 in (170 cm)
- Dancing career
- Current group: National Ballet of Canada

Siphesihle November (born 1998 or 1999) is a South African ballet dancer. He joined the National Ballet of Canada in 2017 and was promoted to principal dancer in 2021, at age 22.

== Early life and training ==
November was born in Zolani, Western Cape. He is the youngest of five children. His brother is dancer and choreographer Mthuthuzeli November. As a child, he danced kwaito, a form of street dance with his brothers. He was spotted by a dance teacher, who invited him to her ballet classes. In 2009, he met a Canadian couple on sabbatical, who recognised November's talents. The following year, with the permission of his dance teacher and mother, the couple brought the eleven-year-old November to Toronto, where he studied at Canada's National Ballet School on scholarship.

== Career ==
In 2017, November was invited to join the National Ballet of Canada by artistic director Karen Kain, without completing an apprenticeship first. In his first year, he danced as Bluebird, a short but technically demanding role, in The Sleeping Beauty. The following year, he was cast as Puck in Ashton's The Dream, sharing the role with three other colleagues, including two principal dancers. He was included in Dance Magazine's "25 to Watch" the same year.

In 2019, he and colleague Jeannine Haller represented the National Ballet at the Erik Bruhn Prize by dancing a pas de deux from La Sylphide and Alysa Pires's new work The Other Side, with him winning the male category. Later that year, he was promoted to second soloist. He is also the subject of Vikram Dasgupta's 2019 documentary Beyond Moving. The production began in 2015, while November was still a student. In 2020, he was promoted to first soloist.

In 2021, November was named principal dancer. At age 22, he tied Guillaume Côté's record of being the youngest principal dancers at the company. He is also the company's second black principal dancer, after Kevin Pugh. His first appearance since his promotion was in Pite's Angels' Atlas, though his debut as Peter/The Prince in The Nutcracker was canceled due to the COVID-19 pandemic. He will also choreograph a new work for the company, which is scheduled to premiere in March 2022.
