= Tina Pereira =

Trinidadian-Canadian ballet dancer and designer

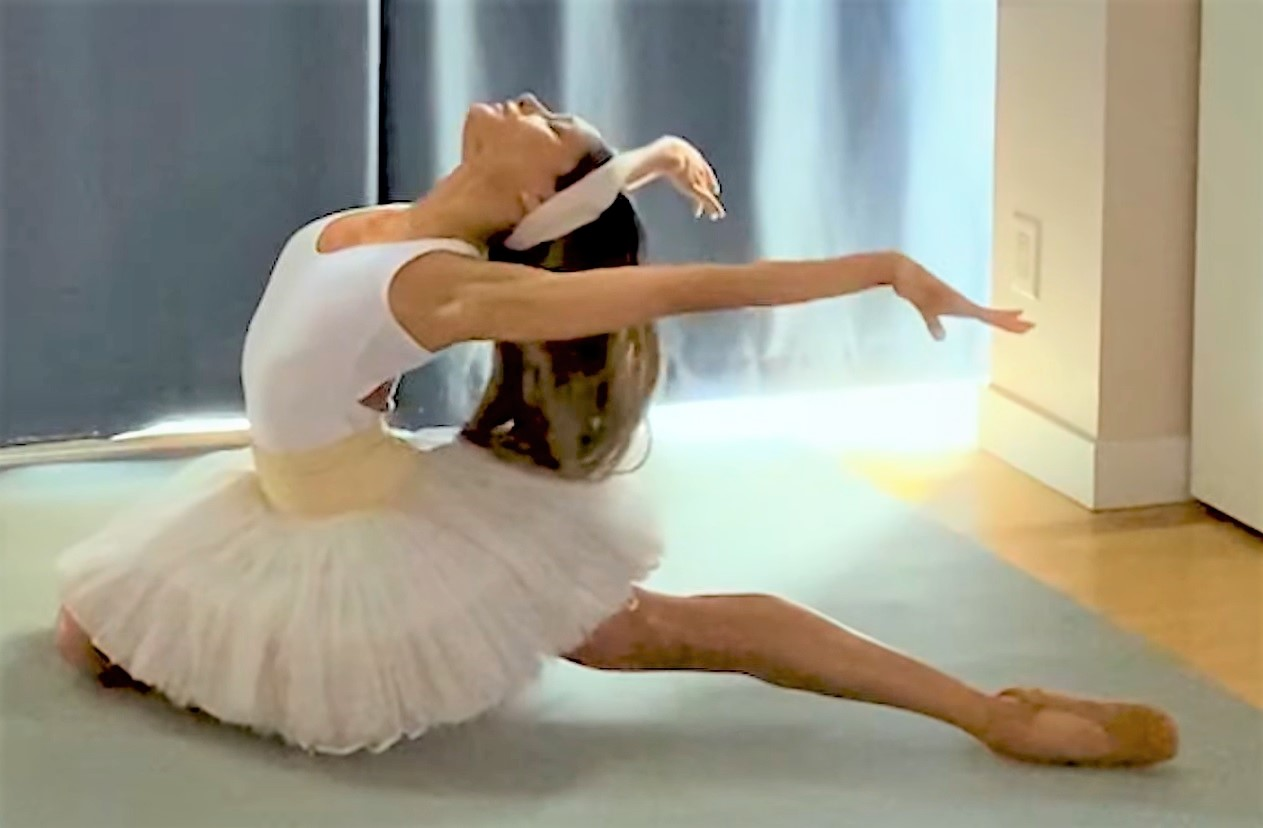
- Pereira in Swans for Relief, 2020
- Born: 1982 or 1983 (age 43–44); Port of Spain, Trinidad
- Education: Canada's National Ballet School
- Occupations: ballet dancer; designer
- Dancing career
- Current group: National Ballet of Canada
- Former groups: Dutch National Ballet

Tina Pereira (born 1982 or 1983) is a Trinidadian-Canadian ballet dancer and designer. She joined the National Ballet of Canada in 2001, then the Dutch National Ballet in 2004. She returned to the Canadian company in 2006, and was promoted to principal dancer in 2021.

== Early life and training ==
Pereira was born in Port of Spain, Trinidad, to a family with Portuguese, Chinese and Trinidadian Creole backgrounds. When she was three, her family immigrated to Mississauga, Ontario, a suburb of Toronto. She started her dance training when she was five, in ballet, tap and jazz. She entered Canada's National Ballet School when she was twelve. In her final year, she was chosen by choreographer Toer van Schayk to dance a main role in Pyrrhic Dances.

== Career ==
Pereira joined the National Ballet of Canada in 2001. She was originally given a two-year apprenticeship but was taken into the corps de ballet four months after joining, and was soon given lead roles. In 2004, she left for the Dutch National Ballet, but returned to the Canadian company in 2006.

In 2007, Pereira represented the company with Keiichi Hirano at the Erik Bruhn Prize and won the female category. She was chosen as a replacement for Bridgett Zehr, who suffered an injury two weeks prior. During the classical portion of the competition, the pair danced a pas de deux from Le Corsaire, but Hirano tore his Achilles tendon mid-performance, and she completed the pas de deux by improvising. In the contemporary portion, instead of a new ballet created for the competition by Sabrina Matthews, she danced the balcony pas de deux from Cranko's Romeo and Juliet with principal dancer Guillaume Côté. She was promoted to second soloist later that year.

In 2009, she was promoted to first soloist. During the 2014-15 season, she suffered from an ankle injury, which led to her being absent from the stage for the entire season. While recovering, she taught herself how to use a sewing machine and make dancewear. She launched her brand Ballerina Couture in November 2015, though she outsourced manufacturing. In 2020, she was featured in Tina, a short documentary about her injury and comeback, made by David Kalinauskas. The same year, she danced Fokine's The Swan at home for Misty Copeland's fundraiser Swans for Relief, to raise funds for dancers struggling due to the COVID-19 pandemic.

In 2021, the 38-year-old Pereira was named principal dancer. The promotion came late in her career.
