= Sonia Rodriguez =

Canadian ballet dancer

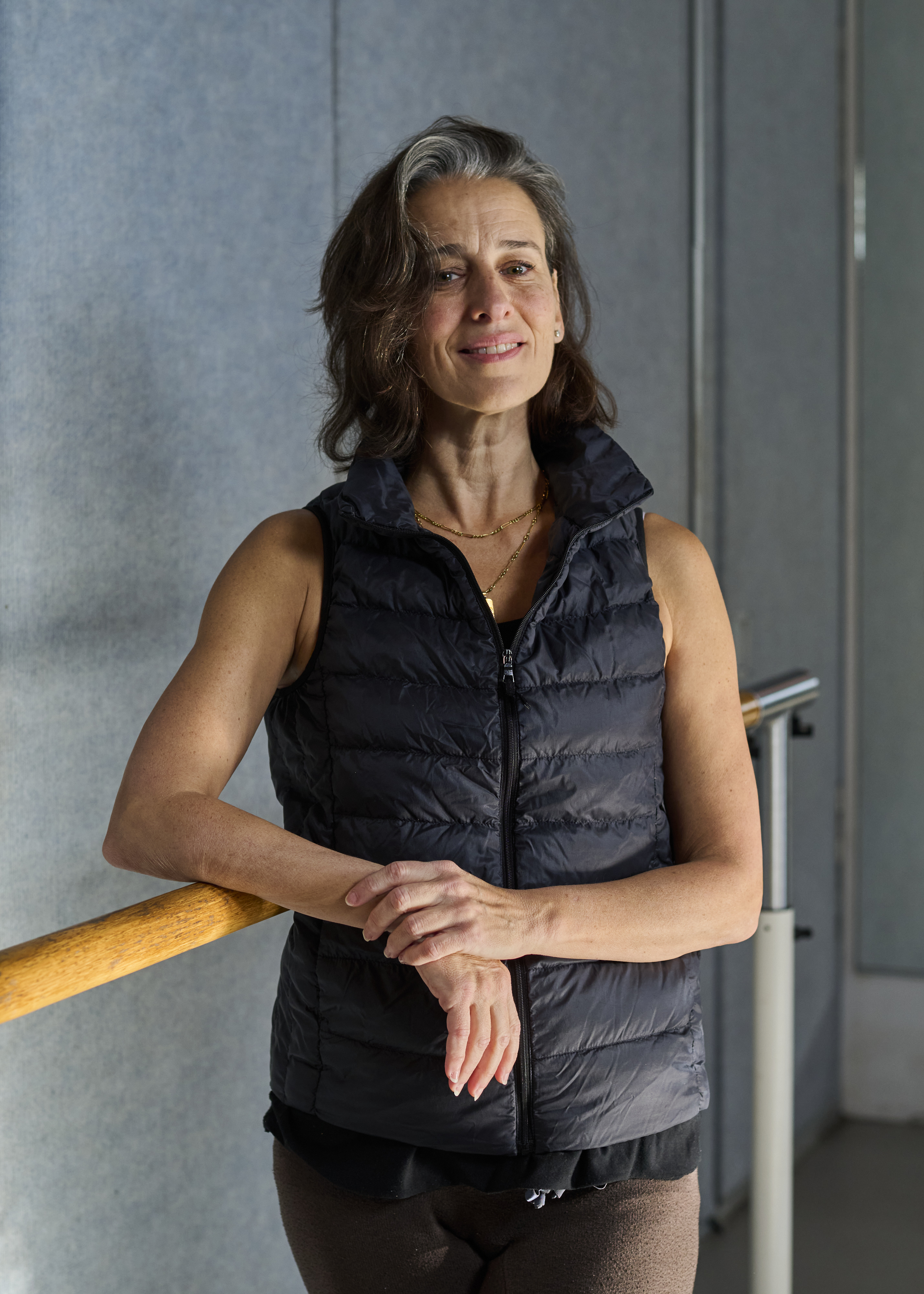
- Born: December 19, 1972 (age 52); Toronto, Ontario, Canada
- Occupation: Ballet dancer
- Years active: 1990-present
- Children: 2
- Career
- Former groups: National Ballet of Canada
- Dances: Ballet

Sonia Rodriguez (born December 19, 1972) is a Canadian ballet dancer. She joined the National Ballet of Canada in 1990 and was promoted to principal dancer in 2000. In 2022, she retired as the longest serving dancer the company.

== Biography ==
Born in Toronto, she moved to Madrid, Spain at age five with her family, where she received dance training with Pedro de la Cruz. She also studied at the Princess Grace Academy in Monaco. In 1990, she returned to Canada to join the National Ballet of Canada, and was promoted to the rank of Principal Dancer in 2000. She has since danced roles such the title role in Cinderella and Aurora in The Sleeping Beauty. In November 2019, she celebrated her 30th anniversary with the National Ballet after a performance of Giselle.

The Los Angeles Magazine praised Rodriguez's performance as the titular role in Alice's Adventures in Wonderland, for "perfectly capturing the mix of playful innocence and bewilderment as she encountered one strange scene after another during her journey." On Rodriguez's portrayal of the title role in Cinderella, the Toronto Star noted she "retain a youthful romantic freshness but also finds opportunities to refine her interpretation."

Outside of the National Ballet, Rodriguez has danced at numerous ballet galas. She also danced the role of Dulcinea in George Balanchine's Don Quixote, restaged by Suzanne Farrell, in 2005.

Rodriguez married Canadian figure skater, Kurt Browning, on June 30, 1996; they have two children. The family home in the Forest Hill area of Toronto suffered a fire on August 18, 2010. They are now divorced.

She was added to Canada's Walk of Fame in 2012.

Rodriguez retired in March 2022.

== Selected repertoire ==
- Hanna Glawari in The Merry Widow
- Odette/Odile in Swan Lake
- Juliet in Romeo and Juliet
- Aurora in The Sleeping Beauty
- The title role in Giselle
- The title role in Manon
- Hermione in The Winter's Tale
- Lise in La fille mal gardée
- Alice in Alice's Adventures in Wonderland
- Romola in Nijinsky
- Anna Karenina
- Blanche DuBois in A Streetcar Named Desire
- Song of the Earth
- Terpsichore in Apollo
- Theme and Variations
- Serenade
- Diamond and Rubies in Jewels
- Dulcinea in Don Quixote (George Balanchine)

=== Created roles ===
- The title role in Cinderella (James Kudelka)
- Princess Vasilisa in The Firebird (James Kudelka)
- An Italian Straw Hat
- The Four Seasons
