= Kevin Pugh (dancer) =

Canadian dancer

- Born: 1960 (age 65–66); Indianapolis, Indiana
- Education: National Ballet School
- Occupations: Dancer, educator
- Career
- Current group: Dance Teq/The In Studio
- Former groups: National Ballet of Canada

Kevin Pugh is a dancer and educator known for his work as a principal dancer with the National Ballet of Canada and as founder of the Dance Teq studio. He has been based for most of his career in Toronto, Canada.

== Early life and education ==
Born in Indianapolis, Indiana in 1960, Pugh entered the National Ballet School at the age of twelve after studying briefly in Stuttgart. As a professional dancer, he studied periodically with Stanley Williams in New York.

== Career ==
Pugh joined the National Ballet of Canada in 1978, rapidly rising to the rank of second soloist in 1979, first soloist in 1980, and principal dancer in January, 1984. He was known for his remarkable athleticism and extraordinary jumps in roles including the Bluebird in The Sleeping Beauty, the Prince in The Nutcracker, the Rose in Le Spectre de la rose and Colas in La fille mal gardée. Following an injury to his foot in November, 1985, he took two years to recover before performing again with the company. He retired from the National Ballet in 1991 due to knee injury.

Pugh is an accomplished teacher, having undertaken guest teaching roles with Ballet Jörgen, Desrosiers Dance Theatre, Ballet British Columbia, in Japan, and the National Ballet of Canada. In 1997 he founded Dance Teq, a dance studio in Toronto, which originally operated out of the National Ballet of Canada building and later moved to Queen Street West.

== Awards ==
Pugh received a notable honour from Rudof Nureyev after a performance of The Sleeping Beauty at the New York State Theatre in 1979, when Nureyev presented his own bouquet to the young dancer. He was named Best New Male Dancer of 1979 by Dance and Dancers (England), and in 1981 he won the Silver Medal at the Fourth Moscow International Ballet Competition along with pas de deux partner Kimberly Glasco.
