= Hope Muir =

Canadian ballet dancer, rehearsal director, teacher and artistic director

- Born: 1970 or 1971 (age 55–56); Toronto, Ontario, Canada
- Education: London Festival Ballet School
- Occupations: dancer; rehearsal director; teacher; artistic director
- Dancing career
- Current group: National Ballet of Canada
- Former groups: English National Ballet; Rambert Dance Company; Hubbard Street Dance Chicago; Scottish Ballet; Charlotte Ballet

Hope Muir (born 1970 or 1971) is a Canadian dancer, rehearsal director, teacher and the artistic director of the National Ballet of Canada. She danced professionally in the UK and US for seventeen years, until her retirement from performing in 2006. Then, she began working as a rehearsal director and teacher. In 2009, she joined Scottish Ballet as a rehearsal director, and became its associate artistic director in 2015. In 2017, she became the artistic director of Charlotte Ballet. In 2022, she assumed her position at the National Ballet of Canada, officially titled Joan and Jerry Lozinski Artistic Director.

== Early life and training ==
Muir was born in Toronto and raised in Etobicoke by a single mother, who sent Muir to dance classes at a young age. In 1987, when she was fifteen, she moved to London, England due to her mother's job. She was among the ten of 400 applicants that were accepted to the London Festival Ballet School (now English National Ballet School), newly founded by Peter Schaufuss.

== Career ==
Muir joined the English National Ballet upon graduating. She remained in the company for four years, and mainly danced classical ballets. In 1994, she joined the Rambert Dance Company, where she danced more contemporary works. In 2004, she moved to Hubbard Street Dance Chicago, where she remained until her retirement from dance in 2006, after performing professionally for seventeen years.

After she stopped performing, she began working as a guest rehearsal director and teacher, remounting works by Crystal Pite, Helen Pickett and Christopher Bruce for various dance companies. She staged Bruce's Rooster for the National Ballet of Canada in 2008, and assisted Pite in choreographing Emergence for the company the following year. In 2009, she joined the Scottish Ballet as a rehearsal director and was promoted to assistant artistic director in 2015. She also served as a rehearsal assistant to Hofesh Shechter when he choreographed Untouchable for the Royal Ballet.

In 2017, she succeeded Jean-Pierre Bonnefoux as the artistic director of Charlotte Ballet in Charlotte, North Carolina, while Patricia McBride remained as the associate artistic director. Her appointment was announced in 2016, and she spent the year prior to her officially taking the post as artistic advisor and shadowed Bonnefoux. She was the first female artistic director in the company's history. In her first season, she founded the company's choreographic lab, which allows company members to create works that are presented at the company black box theatre. During her tenure, she commissioned twelve world premieres, and brought in works by female and international choreographers, including the US premiere of Christian Spuck's Leonce and Lena. During the COVID-19 pandemic, she led the company through various projects even though the dancers could neither perform on stage nor rehearse in studio. After performances of The Nutcracker were cancelled, she and rehearsal director Christopher Stuart choreographed A Fairy-Tailored Nutcracker, which was performed for a social-distanced audience.

In July 2021, it was announced that Muir will succeed Karen Kain as the artistic director of National Ballet of Canada in January 2022. She was invited to apply for the position by the National Ballet's search committee. However, due to the COVID-19 pandemic, she was unable to have any in-person interviews with the company before she was hired. The position was renamed Joan and Jerry Lozinski Artistic Director after two of the company's supporters. When her appointment was announced, Muir stated she plans to prioritize the nurturing of choreographic talents and community engagement.
