= Mavis Staines =

Canadian ballet dancer (born 1954)

Mavis Avril Staines CM (born April 9, 1954) is a Canadian ballet dancer and teacher. Staines grew up in the Eastern Townships of Quebec. In 1972, she graduated from Canada's National Ballet School. After becoming a first soloist with the National Ballet of Canada, Staines later joined The Dutch National Ballet where original work was created for her. After an injury cut her performance career short, she returned to Canada, enrolling in the National Ballet School's Teacher Training Program. She became a member of the Artistic Faculty in 1982. In 1989 she was appointed Artistic Director of the School. For the celebration of the School’s 50th anniversary in 2009, she helped gather 13 of NBS’s partner schools from around the world to present the Assemblée Internationale with a focus on collaboration; a second Assemblée Internationale was remounted in 2013, with a focus on introducing new technology. Staines retired from her role as Artistic Director in June 2024.

From 2002 and 2008, Staines was Artistic President of the Prix de Lausanne. In 1998 she won the Toronto Arts Award for the Performing Arts. In November 2006, she was named one of Canada’s Most Powerful Women by the Women’s Executive Network. In 2008, she was presented an Honorary Doctorate in Humanities from Mount Saint Vincent University. In 2010, Staines was appointed Member of the Order of Canada (CM) in recognition of her "commitment to the education and well-being of individuals in the field of dance."

In February 2013, Staines received the Queen Elizabeth II Diamond Jubilee Medal for her contributions to dance and education.

Staines is a recipient of the 2019 Governor General’s Performing Arts Award for Lifetime Artistic Achievement in Dance.
