= Vanessa Harwood =

Canadian dancer and choreographer

Vanessa Clare Harwood
- Born: 14 June 1947 (age 78); Cheltenham, England
- Career
- Former groups: National Ballet of Canada
- Dances: Swan Lake

Vanessa Clare Harwood, OC (born 14 June 1947) is a Canadian ballet dancer, choreographer, artistic director, teacher, and actress.

Born in Cheltenham, England, Harwood was one of the first pupils at The National Ballet School of Canada in Toronto when it opened in 1959. She joined the National Ballet of Canada in 1965, became a soloist in 1967, and was a principal dancer from 1970 to 1987. Harwood was celebrated for her portrayal of Odette-Odile in Swan Lake, and came to be known as Superswan because of her mastery of the demanding dual role.

As an actor, Harwood had minor roles in Road to Avonlea and Due South. As a choreographer, she makes an uncredited appearance in the introductory sequence of "Poison à la Carte" a 2002 episode of A Nero Wolfe Mystery.

In 1984, Harwood was made an Officer of the Order of Canada. She is also an Advisory Council member of the Dancer Transition Resource Centre.

As of 1969, she was a resident of the Town of Mississauga.
