= Robert Desrosiers =

Canadian dancer and choreographer

- Born: Robert Guy Desrosiers; October 10, 1953 (age 73); Montreal, Quebec, Canada
- Known for: Dancer; Choreographer
- Movement: Modern/Contemporary dance

Robert Guy Desrosiers (born October 10, 1953) is a Canadian dancer and choreographer. After a brief dance career, he founded the Desrosiers Dance Theatre and choreographed surreal and theatrical dances. After the company’s disbandment, he pursued a variety of artistic professions before returning as a freelance choreographer.

== Early life and dance career ==
Desrosiers was born in Montreal, Quebec.

In 1965 he studied at the National Ballet School and briefly danced with the National Ballet of Canada. His tenure with them was short-lived and he left to dance and perform in various dance companies in North America and Europe.

When he moved back to Toronto, he performed with various companies such as Ballet Ys, Dancemakers and Toronto Dance Theatre.

== Choreography and Desrosiers Dance Theatre ==
Inspired by his own choreography ideas, he created a Toronto-based dance company called Desrosiers Dance Theatre in 1980. Some of his early work included Nightclown (1980), Fools Table (1982), and Ultracity (1986) These early works often had dance mixed with elements of theatricality and acrobatics. He often focused on surreal spectacles with fantastical sets, props and costumes.

During the 1980s and 1990s, Desrosiers typically did not create work outside of his company. An exception to this was Blue Snake, commissioned by Eric Bruhn for the National Ballet of Canada. This choreography included three-dimensional sets with automated mechanical structures and surrealistic costumes. While popular, the production was expensive to produce and only showed for one year. This piece gained Desrosiers international attention and led the National Ballet into a new era of their company. The piece was also immortalised in an hour long special produced for television.

Desrosiers was commissioned by the 1988 Calgary Olympics Arts Festival to produce Incognito. Desrosiers danced the role of the main character, who suffers from a mental breakdown and explores various mental disorders, including multiple personality disorder and schizophrenia. The work was based on events from Desrosiers' own life when he felt that his mind and career were out of control. The piece incorporated many different animals and mythological creatures to bring a surrealistic element to the piece. Desrosiers enlisted the help of Doug Henning and Brian Glow to incorporate quick change magic tricks and vanishing acts. After performing at the Olympics, Desrosiers reworked the piece by removing some of the magic acts and rearranging the narrative plot. The updated piece toured throughout Canada and the United States.

Desrosiers' choreography in the 1990s put more emphasis on movement and less on theatricality. Some of this work included Jeux (1990) and Black & White in Colour (1993).

By 1996 Desrosiers returned to theatricality a surreal imagery in his choreography. Desrosiers attempted to stage a complete season of work at what was then known as the O'Keefe Centre. Although seen as an artistic success, this performance was not financially viable. This combined with a decrease in government grants due to government budget cuts and a perceived notion that his choreography was not evolving artistically. Desrosiers was also suffering from a major injury to his right hip, which developed into arthritis. In 1999 the company ceased its operations.

== Other work ==
When his company disbanded, Desrosiers retreated from the dance community. He had very little money and relied on his family for support. He pursued his interest in visual arts in a cabin on a lake near Bancroft, Ontario.

In 2003 Desrosiers was cast as a choreographer in Robert Altman’s The Company. In the film, Desrosiers' character is creating a new choreography for the company. In actuality, he is depicting the creation of his previous work, Blue Snake.

Desrosiers hosted a documentary about dancemakers in the Canadian community with Bravo! Canada from 2004-2006.

In 2007 he was commissioned by Canada's Ballet Jörgen to create Rendezvous.

Desrosiers underwent hip surgery in 2010 to treat his arthritis. The successful operation allowed Desrosiers to begin teaching his choreography again without as much pain. This gave Desrosiers the passion to rebuild his dance career.

Desrosiers returned to Ballet Jörgen in 2013 to create Bouffonia, a choreography that returned to his style of surreal dance with theatricality. The name is based on the French word for clown or jester, and incorporates elements of commedia dell'arte. The music for the piece was composed shortly before the dance premiered, so the dancers practiced with metronomes to set the tempos.

== Awards ==
In 1980 Desrosiers was the first recipient of the Jacqueline Lemieux Prize by the Canada Council. He later won the Jean A. Chalmers Award for choreography in 1985.
