= Frank Augustyn =

Canadian ballet dancer and artistic director

- Augustyn in 1973
- Born: Frank Joseph Augustyn; January 27, 1953 (age 73); Hamilton, Ontario, Canada
- Career
- Former groups: National Ballet of Canada

Frank Joseph Augustyn, OC (born January 27, 1953) is a Canadian ballet dancer and artistic director. He was principal dancer of the National Ballet of Canada and the Berlin Opera Ballet.

== Background ==
Frank Augustyn was born in Hamilton, Ontario. As a boy, Augustyn's interests were in gymnastics and acrobatics; he once appeared on the variety series Tiny Talent Time as a gymnast. During a summer course at Canada's National Ballet School (often called The National) intended to help improve movement and his control for his gymnastic acrobatic training, his abilities for ballet were recognized by Betty Oliphant, founder and director of the school. Although Augustyn's parents were reluctant to have their son pursue ballet as a career, Augustyn continued in the school until at seventeen he joined the professional company National Ballet of Canada.

== Professional career ==
Augustyn joined the National Ballet of Canada in 1970. He was the National Ballet's principal dancer from 1972 to 1989. From 1980 to 1981, he was principal dancer at the Berlin Opera Ballet. From 1985 to 1986, he was the principal guest artist at the Boston Ballet. From 1989 to 1994, he was the artistic director of the Ottawa Ballet. He was a founding member of Ballet Revue (dancing his own piece, Personal Essay) and has appeared frequently on international television. Television viewers are familiar with Mr. Augustyn's series on ballet, Footnotes, seen on Bravo U.S. and Bravo Canada. In this series, which he co-wrote, co-produced and hosted, Mr. Augustyn outlines the history and techniques of classical ballet. He published Footnotes--Dancing the World's Best Loved Ballets, which was based on the television production, as well as his memoir, Dancing from the Heart.

Augustyn often danced with Karen Kain. They won the award for best pas de deux at the 1973 Moscow International Ballet Competition, dancing the extremely difficult Blue Bird pas de deux from Sleeping Beauty. Director of the dance program at Adelphi University since 2000, Augustyn was appointed Program Chair in 2007, stepping down in 2019 appointing Orion Duckstein to chair. He is currently an assistant full time professor at Adelphi, and co-owner of Classical Ballet School of Long Island.

== Awards ==
In 1979, Augustyn was made an Officer of the Order of Canada.
