= National Ballet of Canada =

Canadian ballet company

General information
- Name: National Ballet of Canada
- Year founded: 1951
- First artistic director: Celia Franca
- Principal venue: Four Seasons Centre; Toronto, Ontario
- Website: national.ballet.ca

Senior staff
- Executive director: Charlotte Geeves

Artistic staff
- Artistic director: Hope Muir
- Music director: David Briskin

Other
- Associated schools: The National Ballet School of Canada
- Formation: Principal Dancer; Principal Character Artist (1985–2023); First Soloist; Second Soloist; Corps de Ballet; Apprentice

The National Ballet of Canada is a Canadian ballet company that was founded in 1951 in Toronto, Ontario, with Celia Franca, the first artistic director. A company of 70 dancers with its own orchestra, the National Ballet has been led since 2022 by artistic director Hope Muir. Renowned for its diverse repertoire, the company performs traditional full-length classics, embraces contemporary work and encourages the creation of new ballets, as well as the development of Canadian dancers and choreographers.

The company's repertoire includes works by Sir Frederick Ashton, George Balanchine, John Cranko, Rudolf Nureyev, John Neumeier, William Forsythe, James Kudelka, Wayne McGregor, Alexei Ratmansky, Crystal Pite, Christopher Wheeldon, Aszure Barton, Guillaume Côté and Robert Binet. The National Ballet tours in Canada and internationally, with appearances in London, Paris, Hamburg, Moscow, St. Petersburg, New York City, Washington, D.C., Los Angeles, and San Francisco.

== Creation of the National Ballet of Canada ==
In 1951, the two major ballet companies in Canada were the Royal Winnipeg Ballet headed by Gweneth Lloyd, and the Volkoff Canadian Ballet founded by Boris Volkoff, which was based in Toronto. With the aim of creating a more widely based Canadian ballet troupe, following the example set by the Sadler's Wells Royal Ballet, a group of Canadian ballet enthusiasts set out to create the National Ballet of Canada.

English ballet enthusiasts Sheila Bloom, Rosemary Winckley and Patricia Barnes (née Winckley), who were living in Toronto at the time, were responsible for the initial fundraising, which enabled the company to attract its first dancers, choreographers and artistic director. Both Lloyd and Volkoff were interested in being the first artistic director of the company, but the organizers agreed that the only way to ensure an unbiased selection of dancers for the new ballet company was to hire an outsider. They chose British dancer and choreographer Celia Franca, who had many connections within the dance community and had been to Canada only twice at that point, as artistic director.

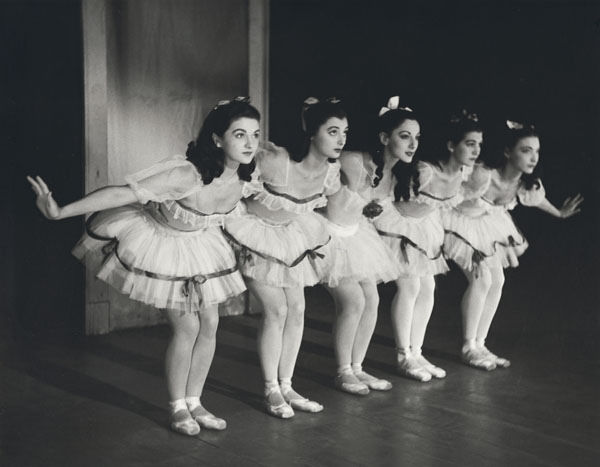
The National Ballet of Canada performing Coppélia in 1952.

Franca at first showed little interest in heading this new company; she had refused similar invitations in Australia and South Africa and liked living in the United Kingdom. Nevertheless, when she came to Canada in 1951 to attend a festival, the founders again asked her to consider the position. Franca accepted the job and became the first artistic director, while Volkoff was appointed as Resident Choreographer. Conductor George Crum acted as musical director.

In August 1951, what was then The National Ballet Guild of Canada launched its first cross-country audition tour. By the end of the month, the ballet had chosen 29 dancers for the troupe and was rehearsing for their first performance in the St. Lawrence Hall.

For The National Ballet Guild of Canada's early performances, Franca chose classic ballets, as she believed this would allow the dancers to be properly judged by the international dance community. The first performance was in the Eaton Auditorium on November 12, 1951. The program included Les Sylphides and Polovtsian Dances from Prince Igor.

== Development ==
The company toured Canada extensively, with Franca, Lois Smith and David Adams as its stars. In 1964, the National Ballet adopted the 3200-seat O'Keefe Centre (now known as Meridian Hall) in Toronto as its home venue. The company moved in 2006 to new facilities at the Four Seasons Centre for the Performing Arts, which was purpose-built for ballet and opera, and is shared with the Canadian Opera Company.

In 1976, Alexander Grant, former principal dancer with London's Royal Ballet and artistic director of Ballet for All, became the artistic director of the National Ballet. Under his leadership, the company added a number of works by Frederick Ashton to its repertoire. The National Ballet of Canada became the first Canadian company to perform at the Royal Opera House, Covent Garden, London in 1979.

In 1981 the company participated alongside Les Grands Ballets Canadiens, the Royal Winnipeg Ballet, le Groupe de la Place Royale, the Danny Grossman Dance Company, the Toronto Dance Theatre, Winnipeg Contemporary Dancers and the Anna Wyman Dance Theatre in the Canadian Dance Spectacular, a dance show at Ottawa's National Arts Centre which was filmed by the National Film Board of Canada for the 1982 documentary film Gala.

In 1989, Reid Anderson became the artistic director. He led the company through a difficult economic recession by choreographing traditional ballet pieces while also commissioning Canadian and international choreographers to create contemporary pieces. In 1995, he left the company citing a frustration of the continued funding cuts from the government, and the directorship was taken up in 1996 by choreographer James Kudelka.

In 2005, Karen Kain, former principal dancer, became artistic director of the company. In 2009, Innovation debuted, a mixed programme featuring three world premieres by Canadian choreographers Crystal Pite, Sabrina Matthews and Peter Quanz. In 2011, the company premiered a new version of Prokofiev's Romeo and Juliet by Alexei Ratmansky. The National Ballet of Canada remains Canada's largest and most influential dance company.

In June 2020, Kain stepped down from the company. The following month, it was announced that Hope Muir will succeed Kain, effective January 1, 2022.

== Canada's National Ballet School ==
The Canada's National Ballet School was founded in 1959 by Celia Franca and Julia Bondy and was directed for many years by co-founder Betty Oliphant. The primary goal of the school is to train dancers for the National Ballet of Canada and also for companies across Canada and around the world. Graduates of the school include Frank Augustyn, Neve Campbell, Anne Ditchburn, Rex Harrington, Karen Kain (former artistic director of the company), James Kudelka (former artistic director of the company), Veronica Tennant, Martine Lamy, John Alleyne, Emmanuel Sandhu, and Mavis Staines (artistic director and co-CEO of the school).

== International recognition ==
Rudolf Nureyev danced with the company in 1965 and returned in 1972 to stage his version of The Sleeping Beauty. His work is credited to raising the standards of the company. He was responsible for bringing the company to Lincoln Center's Metropolitan Opera House in New York City where he showcased the company. The Ballet met with rave reviews and this was a pivotal point in receiving recognition internationally. Karen Kain and Frank Augustyn, two members of NBC, received the prize for best pas de deux at the International Ballet Competition in Moscow in 1973. The following year, in 1974, while on a tour in Canada, Mikhail Baryshnikov defected and requested political asylum in Toronto. His first televised performance after coming out of temporary seclusion in Canada was with the National Ballet of Canada in a version of La Sylphide. More recently the company co-produced Christopher Wheeldon’s The Winter’s Tale with The Royal Ballet in London. The New York Times’ Alastair MaCauley declared that he admired it more in The National Ballet of Canada's performance than when he "saw the ballet’s first performances in London, principally because of Evan McKie’s eloquent interpretation of Leontes." Macaulay also highly praised Francesco Gabriele Frola, Svetlana Lunkina & Jurgita Dronina; all four dancers being Kain recruits. A duet between Hermione (Dronina) and Leontes (McKie) was "a particular breakthrough for Mr. Wheeldon" as well.

== Dancers ==
=== Principal Dancer ===
- Naoya Ebe
- Christopher Gerty
- Spencer Hack
- Koto Ishihara
- Harrison James
- Tirion Law
- Svetlana Lunkina
- Larkin Miller
- Siphesihle November
- Chase O'Connell
- Heather Ogden
- Genevieve Penn Nabity
- Tina Pereira
- Ben Rudisin
- Beckanne Sisk
- Agnes Su

=== Prominent National Ballet dancers ===
- David Adams
- Lawrence Adams
- John Alleyne
- Darren Anderson
- Aleksandar Antonijevic
- Irene Apinee
- Frank Augustyn
- Mikhail Baryshnikov
- Victoria Bertram
- Guillaume Côté
- Robert Desrosiers
- Anne Ditchburn
- Jurgita Dronina
- Lorna Geddes
- Kimberly Glasco
- Chan Hon Goh
- Jury Gotshalks
- Rex Harrington
- Greta Hodgkinson
- Vanessa Harwood
- Yoko Ichino
- Margaret Illmann
- Mary Jago
- Jiří Jelínek
- Karen Kain
- Nehemiah Kish
- Zdenek Konvalina
- Earl Kraul
- Martine Lamy
- Serge Lavoie
- Yseult Lendvai
- Kim Lightheart
- Elena Lobsanova
- Vladimir Malakhov
- Teresa Mann
- Lynda Maybarduk
- Evan McKie
- Emily Molnar
- David Nixon
- Nadia Potts
- Kevin Pugh
- Jeremy Ransom
- Sonia Rodriguez
- David Roxander
- Galina Samsova
- Peter Schaufuss
- Joysanne Sidimus
- Lois Smith
- Raymond Smith
- Piotr Stańczyk
- Veronica Tennant
- Robert Tewsley
- Martine van Hamel
- Jillian Vanstone
- Gizella Witkowsky
- Xiao Nan Yu
- Bridgett Zehr

== See also ==
- List of productions of Swan Lake derived from its 1895 revival
- National Ballet Orchestra of Canada
