= Veronica Tennant =

Canadian producer, director, and filmmaker

- Born: January 15, 1946 (age 79); London, England, UK
- Occupation(s): Former principal ballet dancer; filmmaker; producer; director
- Awards: Order of Canada; Governor General's Performing Arts Award; Canada's Walk of Fame

Veronica Tennant, CC FRSC (born January 15, 1946) is a Canadian producer, director, and filmmaker and a former principal dancer of the National Ballet of Canada. She was born in London, England and moved to Canada with her parents and sister in 1955. Dancing from the age of four, by the age of 18, she became the youngest person ever to enter the National Ballet of Canada.

She made her debut as Juliet in the principal role in Romeo and Juliet with partner Earl Kraul on a choreography by John Cranko. She gave her last performance dancing Juliet again in the same ballet in February 1989. Her official farewell gala in November 1989 includes dance excerpts from Giselle, Washington Square, Canciones, Masada, Onegin as well as a final pas de deux that she never performed before from Cranko's The Taming of the Shrew.

James Neufeld wrote in his book Passion to Dance. The National Ballet of Canada "Veronica Tennant has built a major career and impressive artistic reputation almost entirely within the National Ballet of Canada. One of the company's best-loved ballerinas, she was also a figure of national prominence on the Canadian cultural scene, an eloquent spokesperson for the importance of cultural values in the life of the nation". By 1976, she was a star at the National Ballet and touring across North America, Europe and Japan with Mikhail Baryshnikov, Rudolf Nureyev, and Anthony Dowell, among others, as prima ballerina. During her career from 1964 to 1989, she performed in many ballets by legendary choreographers; Sir Frederick Ashton, Roland Petit, Jiri Kylian, John Neumeier, and championed Canadian choreographers such as James Kudelka, Ann Ditchburn and Constantin Patsalas. Among her performances she appeared in Giselle, La Sylphide, Napoli, The Sleeping Beauty, La Fille mal gardée, Onegin, The Dream, A Party, Washington Square, Hedda, Mad Shadows, Parranda Criolla, Kraanerg, The Newcomers, Whispers of Darkness and Realm in which she mostly interprets the leading roles.

She wrote two children books: the first, On stage, Please : A Story illustrated by Rita Briansky (published in 1977) and the second, The Nutcracker illustrated by the former figure skater Toller Cranston (published in 1985) based on the story of E.T.A. Hoffmann.

As a producer, director and filmmaker, her films and documentaries related to dance were broadcast on channels like CBC, CTV and Bravo. Among them Salute to Dancers for Life/Danser pour la Vie (1994–95), Margie Gillis: Wild Hearts in Strange Times (1996); Karen Kain: Dancing in the Moment (1998); Northern Light - Visions and Dreams (2003); a pairing of SwanS (2004) and Celia Franca: Tour de Force (2006). Several of her productions have been awarded with Gemini Awards given by the Academy of Canadian Cinema & Television.

Tennant is often invited as guest speaker, host and narrator as well as an actor. She performed in the leading role of Leonard Bernstein's On the Town at the Shaw Festival in 1992, and in the title role in The Piano Man's Daughter with Timothy Findley, Sylvia Tyson and Joe Sealy in a 22 performance national tour under the direction of Paul Thompson in 1997.

Tennant is also involved in her community contributing on various artistic boards (Toronto Arts Awards Foundation, Glenn Gould Foundation, Dancer Transition Resource Centre) and charitable events. She has been honorary chair of UNICEF since 1992. In 2015, she conceived and directed NIÁGARA: A Pan-American Story, a multidisciplinary project for the 2015 Pan American Games.

== Awards ==
Veronica Tennant has been awarded honorary doctorates from Brock University, York University, Simon Fraser University, McGill University and the University of Toronto. She serves often as keynote speaker. She has received several awards, including the Toronto Arts Award and the Arts and Letters Award from The Canadian Club of New York City.

In 1975, she was made an Officer of the Order of Canada and was promoted to Companion in 2003. In 2001, she was inducted into Canada's Walk of Fame. In 2006, she was made a Fellow of the Royal Society of Canada. In 2004, Tennant received the Governor General's Performing Arts Award for Lifetime Artistic Achievement, Canada's highest honour in the performing arts.
