= John Alleyne (dancer) =

Canadian ballet choreographer and dancer

John Alleyne (born January 25, 1960) was a Canadian ballet choreographer and dancer, now retired.

== Early life and career ==
Alleyne was born in Barbados on January 25, 1960. In 1965, his family moved to Quebec, Canada, where he grew up. At the age of 13, Alleyne began with his studies at the Canada's National Ballet School as the only black student at the time.

After his graduation in 1978, Alleyne joined Stuttgart Ballet and started his career in choreography. He was tasked with creating various works for the company's internal workshops.

In 1992, Alleyne was appointed Artistic Director of Ballet BC. He remained in that role from 1992 to 2009.

== Works ==
- Phases (1983), In Variation on a Theme (1984), and Weiderkekr (1985) at Stuttgart Ballet
- Blue-Eyed Trek (1988), Split House Geometric (1989-1990) and Interrogating Slam (1991) at The National Ballet of Canada
- Flying To Paris (1989), Go Slow Walter (1990), Talk About Wings (1991), Archeology of Karl... A romantic adventure (1993), Three Visible Poems (1994), The Don Juan Variations (1995), Can you believe she actually said (1995), Remember Me From Then (1996) with Peter. Goldberg (1998), Schubert (1999), The Faerie Queen (2000, adapted and filmed by CBC), Orpheus (2002) Scheherazade (2002), Carmina Burana (2004), The Rite of Spring (2005), A Streetcar Named Desire (2006), and The Four Seasons (2008) at Ballet BC

== Awards ==
- Dora Mavor Moore Award for Outstanding New Choreography (1992)
- Harry Jerome Award for Professional Excellence from the Black Business and Professional Association (1993)
- Honorary Doctorate of Fine Arts from Simon Fraser University (2003)
- Vancouver Arts Award for Performing Arts (2004)
- Exceptional Achievement Award in the Performing Arts from the Black Historical and Cultural Society of British Columbia (2005)
