= James Kudelka =

Canadian ballet dancer and director

James Kudelka, OC (born September 10, 1955 at Newmarket, Ontario), is a Canadian choreographer, dancer, and director. He was the artistic director of the National Ballet of Canada from 1996 to 2005, following which he served as the National Ballet's Resident Choreographer.

== Biography ==
Kudelka began choreographing while a student at the National Ballet School. He joined The National Ballet of Canada in 1972 at 16 and gained critical attention for dramatic ballets such as A Party (1976) and Washington Square (1979).

=== Les Grands Ballets Canadiens ===
Frustrated by what he saw as a lack of creative commitment at the National Ballet, Kudelka joined Les Grands Ballet Canadiens in 1981 where he was a principal dancer. There his choreography changed toward a less dramatic style in works such as In Paradisum (1983) and Alliances (1984).

He was resident choreographer of Les Grands Ballets from 1984 to 1990, while also creating works for other companies such as the Joffrey Ballet, the San Francisco Ballet and the American Ballet Theatre.

=== Artistic Director ===
Kudelka returned to The National Ballet of Canada as Artist in Residence in 1992. In 1995 Kudelka created a new production of The Nutcracker, for the National Ballet. The production's success led Kudelka to be appointed artistic director after Reid Anderson resigned due to frustration over government funding cuts.

As Artistic Director, Kudelka commissioned works from Dominique Dumais and Matjash Mrozewski and from Montréal modernist Jean-Pierre Perreault. He also continued to choreograph for the company, including new versions of Swan Lake and Cinderella. He also acquired several pieces from George Balanchine.

In October 1998, Kudelka took his company on a critically acclaimed tour to New York and on a United States tour in 2004.

=== Wrongful Dismissal Suit ===
In 1998, principal dancer Kimberly Glasco filed a wrongful dismissal suit against the National Ballet of Canada instigated because artistic director Kudelka dropped her from the company roster, allegedly because Glasco had questioned the allocation of funds for his version of Swan Lake. She said that Kudelka told her he was letting her go because she had opposed his plans to spend $1.6 million on the new production and because she had opposed his appointment as artistic director. At the time, the National was nearly $3 million in debt. Glasco also filed complaints with Ontario's Labour Relations Board and Human Rights Commission.

Kudelka maintained that her contract was not renewed for artistic and financial reasons. He alleged that her dancing was not as strong as it had been and that her dismissal was part of a larger strategy to expand the size of the ballet when cutbacks had reduced its budget from $16 million to $14 million. The company's founder Celia Franca and executive director Valerie Wilder spoke out in support of the artistic director. Glasco had the support of former National star Vanessa Harwood, Canadian Auto Workers boss Buzz Hargrove, Dr. Nancy Olivieri and Betty Oliphant.

On March 18, 1999, the National agreed to meet Glasco for private mediation which replaced both the Labour Relations complaint and lawsuit. The case was reportedly settled for $1.6 million in Glasco's favour.

=== Resident Choreographer ===
He resigned as Artistic Director in 2005, being succeeded by retired ballet dancer and Artistic Associate Karen Kain. He was appointed as an Officer of the Order of Canada the same year. Upon retirement, Kudelka served as the National Ballet's Resident Choreographer from 2005-2007.

From 2008 to 2020, he was Resident Choreographer for the contemporary dance company Coleman Lemieux & Compagnie, which performs both existing and new works including From the House of Mirth, Malcolm and Four Old Legs, featuring Prima Ballerina Evelyn Hart.

== In Media ==
He was profiled in Moze Mossanen's 1987 documentary film Dance for Modern Times, alongside David Earle, Christopher House, Ginette Laurin and Danny Grossman.

== Personal life ==
In 1990, Kudelka studied baking at the French Culinary Institute in New York City In 2008, Kudelka opened a bakery business in Vittoria, Ontario The Good Bread Company with his companion and life partner, Jim Wies.

Jim Wies passed away in 2010 at age 58

Kudelka makes his home in St. John's Newfoundland and Labrador

== Selected choreographed works ==
- 1990 Symphony No. 6 for Pastorale
- 1991 Fifteen Heterosexual Duets
- 1991 Musings
- 1993 The Miraculous Mandarin
- 1994 Spring Awakening
- 1994 The Actress
- 1994 Gluck Pas de Deux
- 1995 The Nutcracker
- 1996 Cruel World
- 1997 The Four Seasons
- 1997 Terra Firma
- 1998 Désir
- 1999 Swan Lake
- 1999 A Disembodied Voice
- 2000 The Firebird
- 2002 The Contract
- 2003 The End
- 2003 There, below
- 2004 Cinderella
- 2004 Chacony
- 2005 An Italian Straw Hat
- 2005 Romeo and Juliet before parting
- 2005 Full Circles
- 2013 ... black night’s bright day ...
