= Celia Franca =

Co-founder of the National Ballet of Canada (1921–2007)

Celia Franca CC OOnt
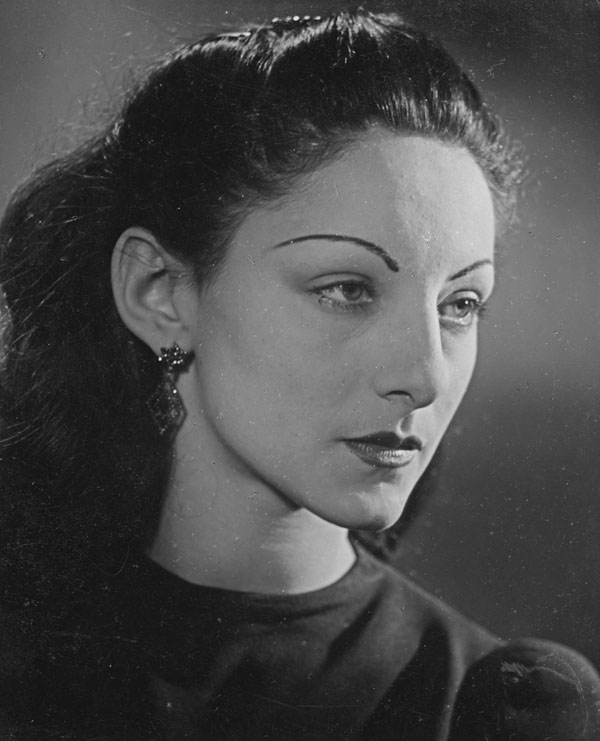
- Born: Celia Franks; 25 June 1921; London, England
- Died: 19 February 2007 (aged 85); Ottawa, Ontario, Canada
- Education: Guildhall School of Music and Drama
- Known for: Founder of The National Ballet of Canada
- Awards: Order of Canada; Order of Ontario

Celia Franca CC OOnt (25 June 1921 – 19 February 2007) was a co-founder of The National Ballet of Canada (1951) and its artistic director for 24 years.

== Early life ==
Franca was born Celia Franks in London, England, the daughter of an East End tailor. Her family were Polish Jewish immigrants. She began to study dance at the age of four and was a scholarship student at the Guildhall School of Music and the Royal Academy of Dance. She made her professional debut aged 14. She successfully auditioned for Marie Rambert's ballet company in 1936. She changed her name to Franca in emulation of Alicia Marks, who changed hers to Alicia Markova. She entered into the first of three marriages, to fellow dancer Leo Kersley.

== Career ==
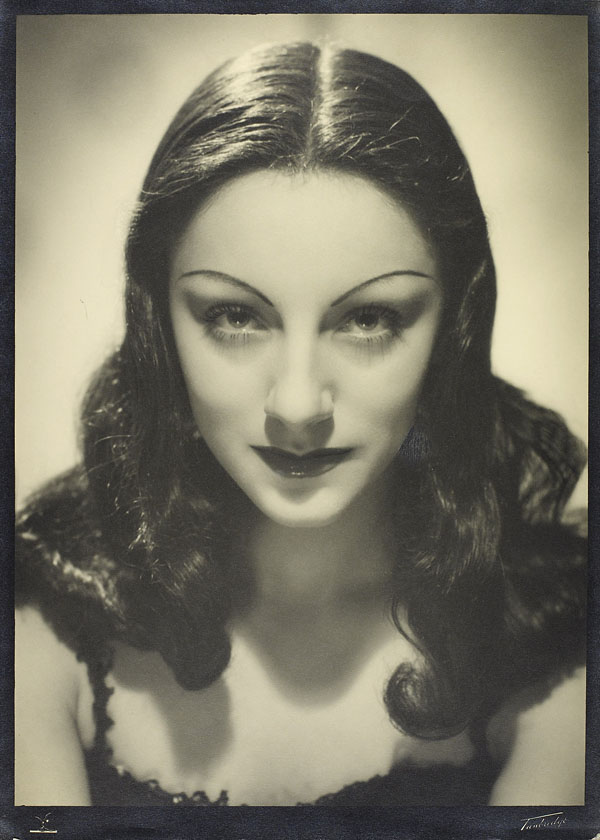
Portrait of Celia Franca between 1943 and 1948

In 1941, aged 20, she was a dramatic ballerina in the Sadler's Wells company. In 1947 she joined the Metropolitan Ballet as a soloist and ballet mistress. It was there that she began choreographing for television, creating the first two ballets – Eve of St. Agnes and Dance of Salomé – commissioned by the BBC.

Franca continued television work after the Metropolitan Ballet shut down. In 1950, a group of Toronto balletomanes asked Franca, who had come to Canada to attend a festival, to start a Canadian classical company; she did so in the very short time of 10 months. While supporting herself as a file clerk at Eaton's department store, she recruited and trained dancers, staged some Promenade Concerts, organized a summer school, gathered an artistic staff and prepared her uneven but enthusiastic new company for its opening on 12 November 1951. She and Betty Oliphant founded the National Ballet School of Canada in 1959 to provide trained dancers for the company.

In 1979, Franca joined Merrilee Hodgins and Joyce Shietze as a co-artistic director to The School of Dance in Ottawa, a non-profit organization designed to provide professional training for dance. Franca lived in Ottawa and was a co-artistic director of The School of Dance.

Franca expanded her role in the academic and arts world, becoming a member of the board of governors of York University and the board of directors of the Canada Council and later served on the Board of Directors for the Canada Dance Festival Society. Franca continued her association with the National Ballet, revising works for the company, including Offenbach in the Underworld (1983) and staging The Nutcracker. She returned to the company to produce a 35th Anniversary Gala Performance at Toronto's O'Keefe Centre.

In 1967, she was made an Officer of the Order of Canada and was promoted to Companion in 1985. In 1994, Franca received a Governor General's Performing Arts Award for Lifetime Artistic Achievement.

After a year of poor health after breaking the vertebrae in her back, she died on 19 February 2007, aged 85, in an Ottawa Hospital.
