= Canada's National Ballet School =

Location
- 400 Jarvis Street; Toronto, Ontario, M4Y 2G6; Canada; 43°39′50″N 79°22′40″W

Information
- Other name: NBS
- School type: Private ballet school and boarding school for academics
- Established: 1959
- Founders: Celia Franca; Betty Oliphant
- Status: Active
- Artistic Director: Margaret Tracey
- Executive Director: John Dalrymple
- Website: www.nbs-enb.ca

Canada's National Ballet School, also commonly known as the National Ballet School of Canada, is a classical ballet school located in Toronto, Ontario, Canada. Along with the Royal Winnipeg Ballet School, it is a provider of professional ballet training in Canada. Margaret Tracey was appointed Artistic Director of the school in 2024, succeeding Mavis Staines who had previously served as Artistic Director since 1989.

== History ==
=== Formation ===
The National Ballet of Canada was formed in 1951 by the English ballet dancer Celia Franca, who had previously been a dancer with ballet companies in the United Kingdom. Franca immigrated to Canada in 1951 and founded the National Ballet of Canada that same year, also hiring the English ballet teacher Betty Oliphant to work with the company.

As the National Ballet became established, Franca and Oliphant decided to create a ballet academy to train dancers for the company. The school, modeled after Britain's Royal Ballet School, opened in 1959 in a former Quaker meeting house at 111 Maitland Street in Toronto, a building purchased for the school by the National Ballet Guild at a cost of $80,000. Oliphant became the school's first Artistic Director.

In 1983, students at the school were featured in the Academy Award-winning National Film Board of Canada dance film Flamenco at 5:15.

=== Expansion ===
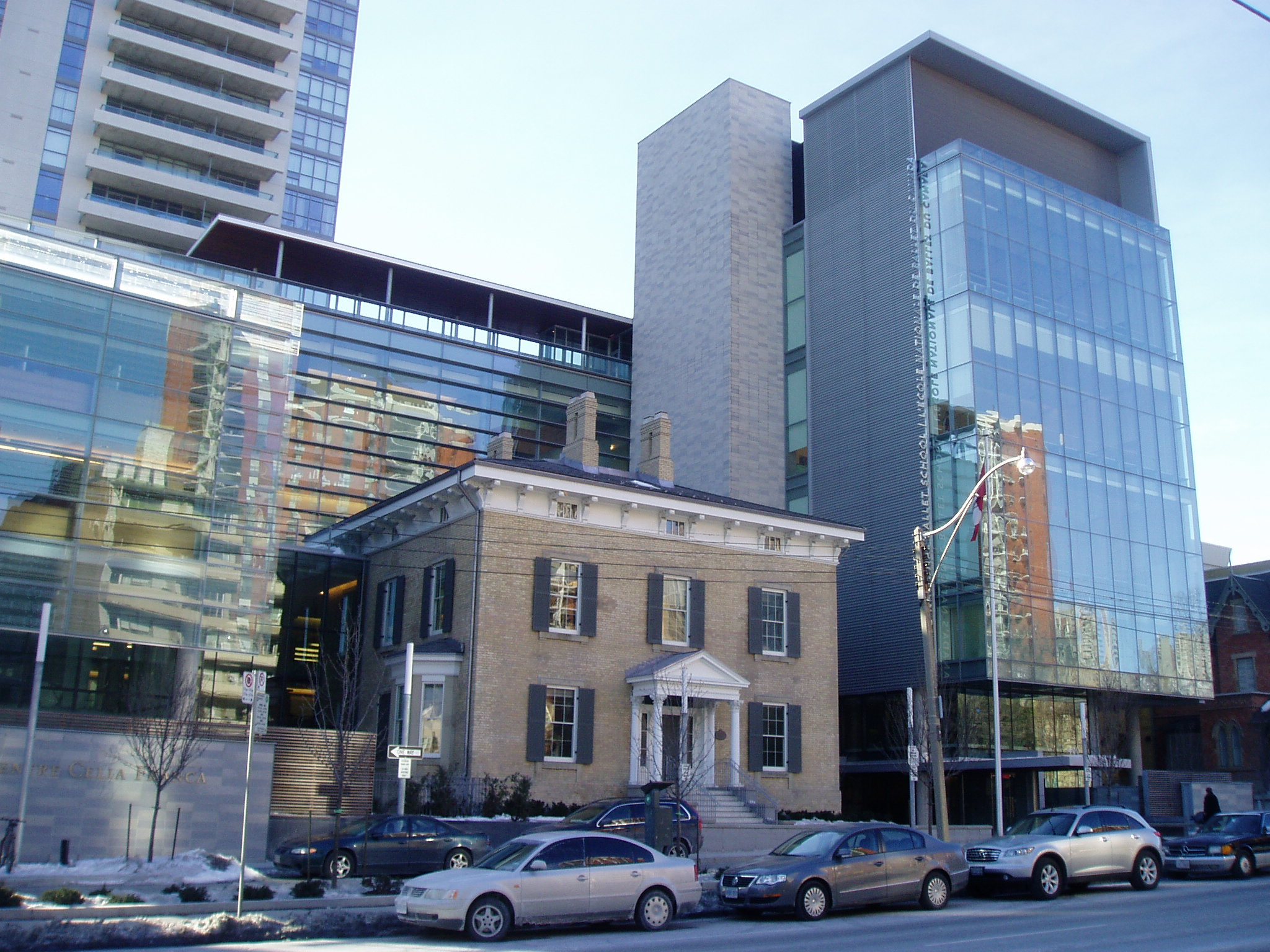
A view of the school on Jarvis Street

In 2000, 400 Jarvis Street, in the Wellesley-Church district, was acquired from the Canadian Broadcasting Corporation for one dollar. The existing buildings on the site were restored and redesigned by Goldsmith Borgal & Company Ltd. Architects (GBCA). Three new buildings, dubbed Project Grand Jete, were planned and built by GBCA, along with Kuwabara Payne McKenna Blumberg Architects (KPMB). Construction began in 2003, and in 2005, the school relocated there.

The major expansion to the school was completed in 2007 at a cost of $100 million. 111 Maitland, now known as Currie Hall, became the school's dining hall.

=== Notable alumni ===
- John Alleyne
- Frank Augustyn
- Neve Campbell
- Brennan Clost
- Guillaume Côté
- Anne Ditchburn
- Kimberly Glasco
- Martine van Hamel
- Rex Harrington
- Jocelyn Hudon
- Brooke Lynn Hytes
- Karen Kain
- James Kudelka
- Martine Lamy
- Evan McKie
- Kevin Pugh
- Mavis Staines
- Veronica Tennant

== Buildings ==
The Margaret McCain Academic Building was built for and originally housed Havergal Ladies' College from 1898 until 1932, and then housed the Canadian Broadcasting Corporation's main radio studios in Toronto from 1945 until 1996.

Included as part of the school is a heritage building – the 1856 home of Sir Oliver Mowat, the longest-serving Premier of Ontario, a Father of Confederation, and later Ontario's Lieutenant-Governor. The mansion, originally named Norfield House (used by Havergal College from 1913 to 1932, and then by the CBC), was renamed Lozinski House and now houses the school's artistic and administrative offices.

The architectural firms of Goldsmith Borgal & Company Ltd. Architects (GBCA) and Kuwabara Payne McKenna Blumberg Architects (KPMB) integrated the original buildings with three new buildings, using contemporary construction composed of glass, steel, metal panels, and concrete blocks, which appears transparent from the street façade. The three new buildings were completed in 2007: the Celia Franca Centre, a "Bar" building, and a six-storey "North Tower" building, which consists of three large studio spaces, each stacked on top of the other.

The Celia Franca Centre is used for multiple purposes. Twelve dance studios of various sizes, some of which are facing Jarvis Street, are visible to passersby. The Celia Franca Centre also includes a coffee shop, library/ resource centre, study areas, and seating zones. The Betty Oliphant Theatre has change rooms, dressing rooms, and wardrobe all encompassed within the Celia Franca Centre. The façade of the Celia Franca Centre consists of glazed curtain walls combined with cultured stone tiles tied by steel grate panel sub-structures. The choreography of the opening scene of The Nutcracker is visible in the suspended frit glass of the south pavilion facade in Benesh notation.
