= Noreen Young =

Canadian puppeteer (1939–2025)

- Born: Noreen Isabel Brathwaite; 10 May 1939
- Died: 18 April 2025 (aged 85); Ottawa, Ontario, Canada
- Spouse: Bruce Kingsley
- Children: 5

Noreen Isabel Young (née Brathwaite; 10 May 1939 – 18 April 2025) was a Canadian producer, puppeteer and puppet builder.

== Life and career ==
Young grew up in Old Ottawa South, Ontario, with her two younger brothers, John and Stephen Brathwaite, then studied drawing and painting at the Ontario College of Art and Design in Toronto.

Reading whatever she could, she learned how to build her own puppets and she became known for puppets cast with liquid latex so she could sculpt them, rendering it possible for the faces to move and the mouths open and close.

Young began her lifelong career in television puppetry at CJOH/CTV and CBOT/CBC in Ottawa, notably with Hi Diddle Day (1967–1976) (a show about a female mayor named Gertrude Diddle, in a small town called Crabgrass) and Pencil Box (1977 - 1979). The former received an Ohio State Award and the latter received ACTRA's Best Children's Programme in 1978. She was known for building puppets for shows including Today's Special and Téléfrançais!. She became an independent television producer with Noreen Young Productions Inc., which, with CBC and Telefilm Canada, produced Under the Umbrella Tree, a popular CBC Television children's series that ran from 1987 to 1993 on the CBC nationally and from 1990 to 1997 on the Disney Channel. It was also dubbed in French for Canal Famille and currently streams on the Canada Media Fund's Encore+ on YouTube in both languages. For that show, she was Executive Producer and performed the character "Gloria the Gopher".

Young was also the puppeteer for "Dodi", a character on Sesame Park, the Canadian version of Sesame Street. Her puppet characters appeared on many TVOntario productions, including Readalong and Téléfrançais! and she was featured in the second Care Bears television special, 1984's The Care Bears Battle the Freeze Machine.

Young was known for her caricature puppets of public figures such as former Governor-General Adrienne Clarkson, CBC news anchor Peter Mansbridge and hockey commentator Don Cherry, plus many prominent personalities from her hometown of Almonte, Ontario.

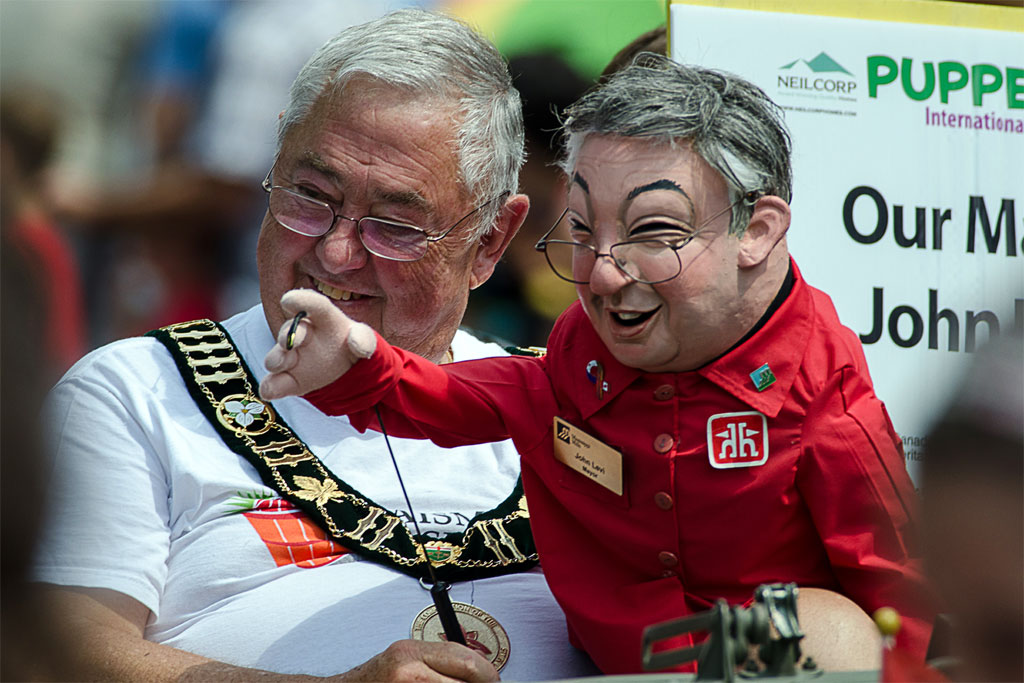
A caricature puppet designed by Young, pictured in 2012

In 2018, Young's puppets were featured in an exhibit "Noreen Young, a Puppet Retrospective", at the Mississippi Valley Textile Museum, in Almonte. The 150 puppets from her collection that were exhibited spanned her career from 1967 to 2018. They included Basil the Beagle from Hi Diddle Day (1967–1976) and 10 puppets which she created for an adult opera, "Sleeping Rough", written by composer Roddy Ellias and performed for the Ottawa music festival, "Music and Beyond" (2018). Many of her puppets now reside in the National Museum of History and at Library and Archives Canada.

== Personal life and death ==
Young was married to Bruce Kingsley and had two children and three step-children. She died at the Ottawa Civic Hospital on 18 April 2025, at the age of 85. She was cremated at C.R. Gamble Funeral Home. Her family and friends hosted her celebration of life at Almonte Old Town Hall on May 24, 2025.

== Order of Canada ==
In 1995, Young was invested as a Member of the Order of Canada for having "effectively used puppetry to educate children on such crucial issues as safety, nutrition, environmental awareness and addictions."
