= Nerene Virgin =

Canadian actress and journalist (1946–2024)

- Born: December 27, 1946; Hamilton, Ontario, Canada
- Died: January 15, 2024 (aged 77); Burlington, Ontario, Canada
- Occupations: Journalist, actor, educator, author, television host
- Notable work: Today's Special

Nerene Virgin (December 27, 1946 – January 15, 2024) was a Canadian journalist, actor, educator, author, and television host, best known for her role on the children's television series Today's Special.

== Background ==
Virgin was born in Hamilton, Ontario. She was a great-granddaughter of escaped Maryland slave Thomas John (Howard) Holland, and great-niece of pastor John Christie Holland. She was born Nerene Grizzle, daughter of Kathleen V. Toliver and Stanley G. Grizzle.

After growing up in Toronto, she attended Toronto Teacher's College. Virgin was also certified as a special education teacher at Brock University, focusing on intellectually gifted children, and held special qualifications in teaching integrated arts. Virgin began her career as a teacher, working for the Toronto Board of Education.

She later moved into children's programming with Ontario's public broadcaster TV Ontario, playing Jodie on Today's Special. This series was in production for seven years. Virgin also had recurring roles on other television programs, including The Littlest Hobo, Night Heat, and Ramona. Virgin played the role of Ellie the dispatcher on Police Surgeon, a CTV series originally named Dr. Simon Locke. She appeared in films such as Gotti, The Undergrads, Murder in Space, and Right of the People.

Virgin was a singer with the Tiaras, a Toronto-based girl group. Virgin joined Colina Phillips and Patricia Grizzle after Brenda Russell left the trio and moved to Los Angeles.

Virgin worked as the weather and community reporter for CBOT, the CBC Television station in Ottawa, in the late 1980s. She then worked at CTV station CFTO in Toronto as the host of Eye on Toronto, co-host for the entertainment show Showbuz, and host on CTV's annual Miracle Network Telethon for the Hospital for Sick Children.

In 1996, Virgin became the host for the daily national current affairs show Coast to Coast for CBC Newsworld in Calgary, Alberta. She returned to Toronto as the anchor to launch the national weekend newscast Saturday Report for CBC Television. She then moved to the anchor chair at Newsworld International until it was dismantled and taken over by Al Gore's Current TV in July 2005.

Virgin then chose to leave CBC to complete further studies, gaining certification in teaching English as a second language, and taught students in Linhe, Inner Mongolia, China. She later taught French in Stoney Creek.

Virgin served on the board of directors for Phoenix Place, a second-stage home for women and children who have survived domestic violence. She was also a public member of the council for the College of Early Childhood Educators, the first such college in North America. Virgin served as a member of Hamilton's Committee Against Racism for the 2010–2014 and 2014-2018 terms of council.

Virgin died of heart failure in Burlington, Ontario, on January 15, 2024. She was survived by her husband Alan Smith, daughters Yvette and Nicole, and son Thomas.

== Black History work ==
Virgin applied her educational background and journalism skills to research, write and present stories of notable Black people in Canadian and U.S. history. She published biographies of Charles Victor Roman, Charles Lightfoot Roman, and John Christie Holland with Historica Canada. These articles were also published in The Canadian Encyclopedia. Virgin worked with the Dundas Museum and Archives to nominate Charles Victor Roman as a laureate to the Canadian Medical Hall of Fame. She worked with the Hamilton-Wentworth District School Board to embed Black history into the regular school curriculum.

Virgin's educational presentations were often based on the exploits of her great-great-grandfather, private Lewis Toliver, and his eleven-year service in the All Coloured Militia during the Upper Canada Rebellion of 1837–38 and the building of the Second Welland Canal. This endeavor was a pilot project for the Ministry of Education.

== Political career ==
Virgin first sought political office in 2007 in the federal riding of Hamilton Mountain, but she later withdrew from the race. She then decided to seek political office in Hamilton East—Stoney Creek, even though she resided outside the riding boundaries. In 2016, she was named one of Canada's 100 Accomplished Black Canadian Women in history.

On July 31, 2007, after using a three-member panel interview process, the Ontario Liberal Party announced that Virgin had been acclaimed as the candidate in Hamilton East—Stoney Creek for the 2007 provincial election. The panel consisted of incumbent MPP Jennifer Mossop (who did not seek reelection), a party organizer, and the riding president. The decision to appoint Virgin upset some local Liberal party members, but Virgin expressed optimism in her outreach abilities.

In the aftermath of Virgin's acclamation as a candidate, the Hamilton Community News referred to her as a "tar baby". While the paper issued an apology for its use of the pejorative term, Virgin indicated that the paper should do more than just apologize, suggesting setting up a scholarship or a program designed to address racism and discrimination. Virgin sued Metroland Media Group due to that racial slur. She was represented by lawyers Kikelola Roach, Charles Roach, and Julian Porter. The newspaper settled the lawsuit to Virgin's satisfaction.

On election day, Virgin finished second to New Democrat candidate Paul Miller.

== Electoral record ==
Riding: Hamilton East—Stoney Creek (provincial electoral district)

2007 Ontario general election
Party	Candidate	Votes	%	±%
New Democratic	Paul Miller	16,256	37.6	
Liberal	Nerene Virgin	15,171	35.1	
Progressive Conservative	Tara Crugnale	9,195	21.3	
Green	Raymond Dartsch	2,122	4.9	
Family Coalition	Robert Innes	451	1.0	

== Filmography ==
Year	Title	Role	Notes
1972–1974	Police Surgeon	Ellie the Dispatcher	17 episodes
1973	The Starlost	Valerie	Episode: "Circuit of Death"
1980	Polka Dot Door	Host	10 episodes
1981–1987	Today's Special	Jodie	Syndicated
1981	The Littlest Hobo	Miss Watson	Episode: "East Side Angels"
1985	The Undergrads	Polly Harris	TV movie
1985	Murder in Space	Dr. Margaret Leigh	TV movie
1985	Perry Mason	Minicam Reporter	Perry Mason Returns
1985–1988	Night Heat	Judy Burns, Frances, Mrs. Simmons	5 episodes
1986	The Right of the People	Diane Trainor	TV movie
1986	A Deadly Business	Reporter	TV movie
1988	Diamonds	Edna Lawrence	Episode: "There`s No Business..."
1988	Garbage Pail Kids	Character Voice	3 episodes
1988	Ramona	Mrs. Larson	3 episodes
1996	Due South	Reporter No. 3	Episode: "Red, White or Blue"
1996	Gotti	Reporter No. 6	TV movie
1996	Mistrial	Reporter No. 4	TV movie

== Awards ==
Virgin was in her mid-teens when she was crowned Miss Sepia Toronto. She expected that this would lead her to be a contestant in the Miss Canada pageant but was later told that a Black girl would not be allowed to compete.

Previously, in February 2012, she was honored for professional achievement and with a Rev. John C. Holland Award, named after her great-uncle. Virgin received an Illuminesence Award in 2014. On May 2, 2016, it was announced that Virgin was named one of Canada's 100 Accomplished Black Canadian Women.
