= Nina Keogh =

Canadian puppeteer

Nina Keogh (/ˈkiːoʊ/ KEE-oh) is a Canadian puppet builder, voice actress and puppeteer. She is a former member of the Academy of Canadian Cinema and Television, Canadian Actors' Equity Association, UDA, and is an ACTRA member since 1968. She was on the board of directors for ACTRA and the Children's Broadcast Institute. She has worked for TVO and CBC Television. She is best known for playing the role of Muffy the Mouse in TVO's 1981-87 TV series Today's Special, which was shown worldwide including on Nickelodeon in the United States. Her father, John Keogh, played Howard the Turtle in Razzle Dazzle. Keogh retired from the television business in 1999 to become a professional painter.

She is a former instructor at Fleming College (Haliburton School of the Arts) in Haliburton.

== Works ==
- Drop-In 1970 and 1971 host
- Polka Dot Door 1971 and 1972 host
- TVO's. Whatever Turns You On 1973 host
- Readalong 1976
- Today's Special 1981-87 (Muffy)
- The Friendly Giant 1982
- Téléfrançais! 1984–1986
- The Magic Library 1989
- Bookmice 1991 (Norbert)
- Mr. Dressup 1992
- The Santa Clause 1994
- Hello Mrs. Cherrywinkle 1996
- Groundling Marsh 1997 (Crystal)
- Sesame Park 1998
