= Charles Roman =

Charles Roman may refer to:

- Charles Victor Roman (1864–1934), American-born Canadian surgeon, professor, author, and civil rights activist
- Charles Lightfoot Roman (1889–1961), his nephew, Canadian surgeon, author and researcher
