= Matthew Bullock (disambiguation) =

Matthew Bullock was an African American who fled to Canada and became a cause célèbre in the early 1920s.

Matthew Bullock may also refer to:

- Matthew Bullock (banker) (born 1949), Master of St Edmund's College, Cambridge and former banker
- Matthew Bullock (footballer) (born 1980), English footballer
- Matthew W. Bullock (1881–1972), social leader, civil servant and leading African-American
