= Matthew Bullock =

Matthew Bullock was a black American accused of inciting a riot, who fled to Canada and became a cause célèbre in the early 1920s.

== 1921 incident ==
In Norlina in Warren County, North Carolina on 18 January 1921, Bullock's brother Plummer attempted to return 10 cents worth of bruised apples that a white store clerk had switched for the ones that the 19-year-old Bullock had originally chosen. The storekeeper refused to exchange the apples, and a heated argument broke out; as other white men entered the store, Plummer Bullock left. Four nights later, an angry and armed white mob set out to "punish" Bullock for his "insolence"; they were met by a group of African American men determined to protect their neighborhood from the advancing mob. A gunfight ensued, injuring a number of men on both sides. Immediately thereafter, a deputized white mob swept into the Black neighborhood and arrested between 14 and 18 men; all were charged with "inciting to riot," while some were also charged with intent to murder. Plummer Bullock was among this group, though his brother Matthew was not captured. The men were all jailed in the county seat of Warrenton.

The next night, a white mob stormed the jail and lynched Plummer Bullock and his distant cousin Alfred Williams (whom many contend was with him in the confrontation at the store). Matthew Bullock fled town, and eventually made it to Canada. There he settled in Hamilton, Ontario working in the construction industry.

== Arrest and imprisonment ==
When he was located in Canada in 1922, the state of North Carolina demanded his extradition, and Bullock was imprisoned in the Hamilton jail for immigration violations. In Canada he became a cause celebre as activists insisted that he would not receive a fair trial due to his race if extradited to North Carolina, and could face the same fate as his brother. The campaign for his release was led by the congregation of St. Paul's African Methodist Episcopal Church (In 1937 St. Paul's was renamed Stewart Memorial Church), Rev. J. D. Howell and Asst. pastor John Christie Holland. Also very involved was the newspaper The Globe which gave extensive coverage to the case. There were five editorials about the case in the New York Times. In the United States the NAACP campaigned on Bullock's behalf, but the white residents of Norlina circulated a petition demanding his extradition. North Carolina Governor Cameron A. Morrison pressured the State Department to have Bullock returned to face trial.

On January 26, 1922 Charles Stewart, the Canadian minister of the interior, announced that Bullock would be released from detention in Hamilton, and that his illegal entry into Canada would be forgiven due to his exemplary behaviour while living in Canada. Only a few weeks later, however, the Americans reiterated their demands for extradition and Bullock was again arrested. The judge in Bullock's extradition hearing, Colin George Snider, demanded that prima facie evidence of Bullock's guilt be presented before he would be extradited. Since almost all the evidence was eyewitness accounts, this would have required the government of North Carolina to send witnesses to Hamilton. Governor Morrison rejected this, stating, "I am not going to try North Carolina’s honor and integrity before any judge in any foreign country" and the Canadian judge released Bullock.

== Later life ==
Bullock's later life is unclear. Some reports were that he went to England, others that he remained in Canada, though he is known to have sometimes visited his family in Washington, DC.
