= Here's Duffy =

Canadian variety television program

- Genre: Variety
- Written by: John Aylesworth; Allan Manings; Frank Peppiatt
- Presented by: Jack Duffy
- Country of origin: Canada
- Original language: English
- No. of seasons: 2

Production
- Producer: Bill Davis
- Running time: 30 minutes

Original release
- Network: CBC Television
- Release: 21 June 1958 – 10 October 1959

Here's Duffy is a Canadian variety television program that aired on CBC Television from 1958 to 1959.

== Premise ==
Singer and comedian Jack Duffy hosted this program with regular performers such as singing quartet The Crescendoes, comedy performer Jill Foster and an orchestra under the direction of Eddie Karam. Salada tea was the show's sponsor. Larry D. Mann also appeared on the series.

== Scheduling ==
This half-hour series began as a mid-year replacement on Saturdays at 10:30 p.m. from 21 June to 20 September 1958. It was then given a full season on Fridays at 8:00 p.m. from 3 October 1958 to 31 January 1959, shifting to Thursday at 10:30 p.m. from 5 February to 25 June 1959. After this final season run, one later episode was scheduled on 10 October 1959.
