= Sesame Park =

Canadian children's TV series

- Also known as: Sesame Street Canada (1972–1980's); Canadian Sesame Street (1980's–1996)
- Created by: Daniel McCarthy
- Country of origin: Canada (Note: The original series was produced in the United States. Originally, only the especially-made segments were Canadian, but after the Sesame Park rebranding, the show became fully Canadian.)
- Original languages: English; French
- No. of seasons: 5
- No. of episodes: 340

Production
- Producer: Daniel McCarthy
- Running time: 60 minutes (1972–1996); 30 minutes (1996–2001)
- Production companies: Sesame Workshop; Canadian Broadcasting Corporation

Original release
- Network: CBC Television
- Release: May 15, 1972 – August 24, 2001

Related
- Sesame Street

Sesame Park is the Canadian (Note: The original series was produced in the United States. Originally, only the especially-made segments were Canadian, but after the Sesame Park rebranding, the show became fully Canadian.) version of Sesame Street co-produced by Sesame Workshop and the Canadian Broadcasting Corporation.

The series originally functioned as a re-edited version of the original American series, and was named Sesame Street Canada and later, Canadian Sesame Street, with some of the segments replaced with ones produced in Canada and later featuring Canadian-exclusive Muppet characters. In 1996, the series adopted a new format and was renamed Sesame Park.

== Background ==
After the original American version of Sesame Street premiered in the United States in 1969 to major success, Director of Information Programs for the CBC Knowlton Nash approached Children’s Television Workshop (CTW) to acquire the first season of 52 episodes for the CBC. The private CTV Television Network also offered a competing bid, but CBC won the rights to air the program by citing its larger broadcast footprint.

On 12 February 1970, the Canadian Radio-television and Telecommunications Commission announced an increase in Canadian content requirements to 60 percent, however, Nash chose to pursue acquisition and received a verbal guarantee to exempt Sesame Street for one year. The CRTC later announced that stations can exceed the maximum 30 percent quota of American programming for the 1970-71 broadcast season if the excess was caused by the airing of Sesame Street.

The program began airing in Canada on 30 September 1970 to critical acclaim and public enthusiasm, with 10,000 viewers writing to CTW for educational materials. However, both the CRTC and newspaper columnists expressed concerns about the majority African American cast, the depictions of New York City, and references to “cows across America”. At the same time, financial concerns over CRTC regulations led Calgary CBC affiliate CHCT-TV (now CICT-DT) to announce on 2 January 1971 that they planned to drop the series, prompting protests from viewers, escalating to letter campaigns to the CRTC. The CRTC ultimately agreed to extend the waiver for Sesame Street for the 1971-72 broadcast season.

While Nash was impressed by the support, it emboldened CTW to increase the renewal rate for the second season to US$280,000. Financial concerns from CBC stations led to more announcements of dropping the program, prompting further backlash from the Canadian public. Throughout this time, columnists expressed concerns about elements of the series such as the American English dialect being used in the program. The introduction of the Puerto Rican character Maria Rodriguez (played by Sonia Manzano) and the resulting introduction of Spanish-language segments prompted further demands for a Canadian version of the program that would teach Canadian children English and French in a similar manner.

== Canadian Sesame Street ==
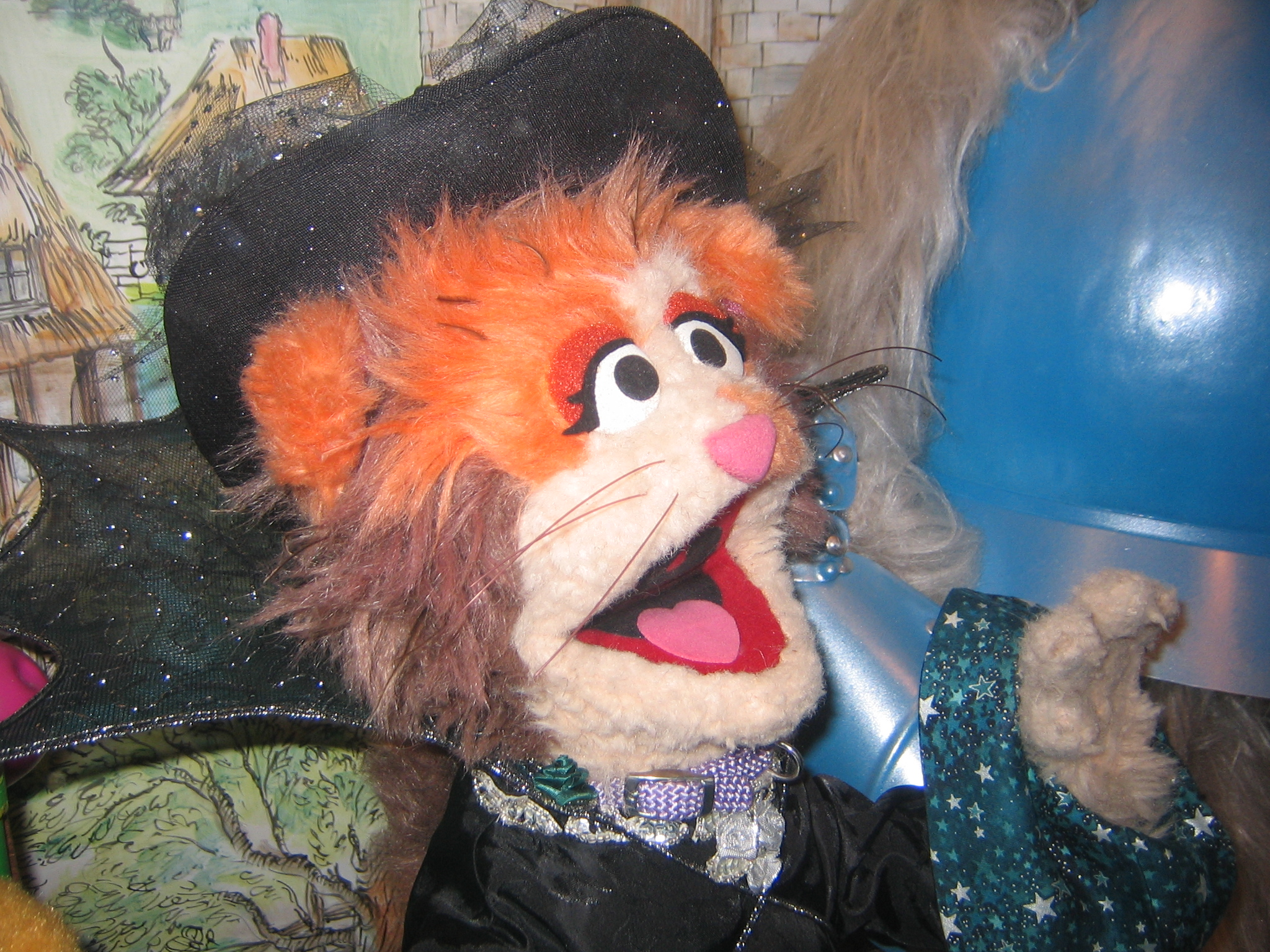
Muppet Chaos

Daniel McCarthy, the director of the CBC Sesame Street Project, developed Sesame Street Canada for CBC Television. The series, which debuted in 1972, was originally a hybrid of American and Canadian production segments. McCarthy partnered with the Children's Television Workshop to introduce new, CBC-produced segments to the show's original American footage. He also introduced distinct Canadian themes and set designs to the show.

The series was later titled Canadian Sesame Street. During the 1970s and 1980s it anchored a three-show block that included Friendly Giant (later replaced by Fred Penner's Place) and Mr. Dressup.

Most of the production of the Canadian segments took place in Vancouver, Winnipeg, Toronto, Halifax, and Montreal.

=== Content ===
In 1972, the bulk of Sesame Street's content was licensed out to CBC Television, originally as five-minute interstitials during commercial breaks. CBC then added live-action and animated segments teaching about Canadian culture and French bilingualism, replacing segments on Spanish and American history on the original program. Some Spanish segments still aired in Canada, although fewer in number and usually related to the show's Hispanic main-cast characters, Maria and Luis.

In 1981, the amount of Canadian content per show was increased to 30 minutes.

In 1990 a seasonal special was created for the series, titled Basil Hears A Noise.

=== Characters ===
In 1987, a series of specially made Canadian Muppet characters were introduced, including Basil the Bear (similar and equal in role to Big Bird), French-Canadian Louis the Otter (similar and equal in role to Oscar the Grouch), and Dodi the bush pilot. The following year, additional new characters included Dr. Bazuki, Fern, Robert, and wheelchair-user Katie.

The Henson Muppet shop also provided some Anything Muppets which could be redressed to become whatever characters the script called for, including Barbara Plum (a parody of CBC broadcasting legend Barbara Frum). Beau Beaver, an animated character, would discuss national symbols, particularly those appearing on Canadian money. In 1994, anchorman Peter Londonbridge, based on journalist Peter Mansbridge, and storyteller Margaret Redwood, based on writer Margaret Atwood, were added to the cast.

=== Messaging ===
The 1987 season focused on multiculturalism, family, and the environment.

== Sesame Park ==
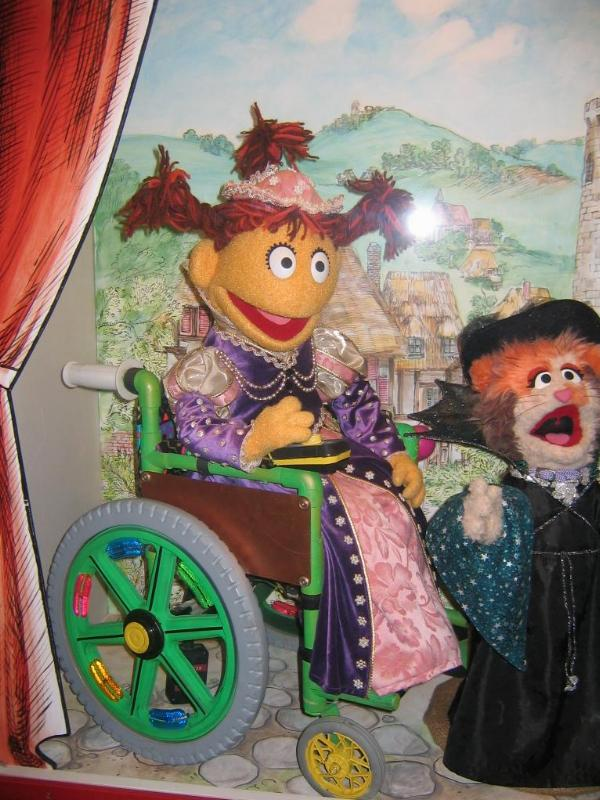
Muppet Katie on display at the CBC museum dressed as a princess

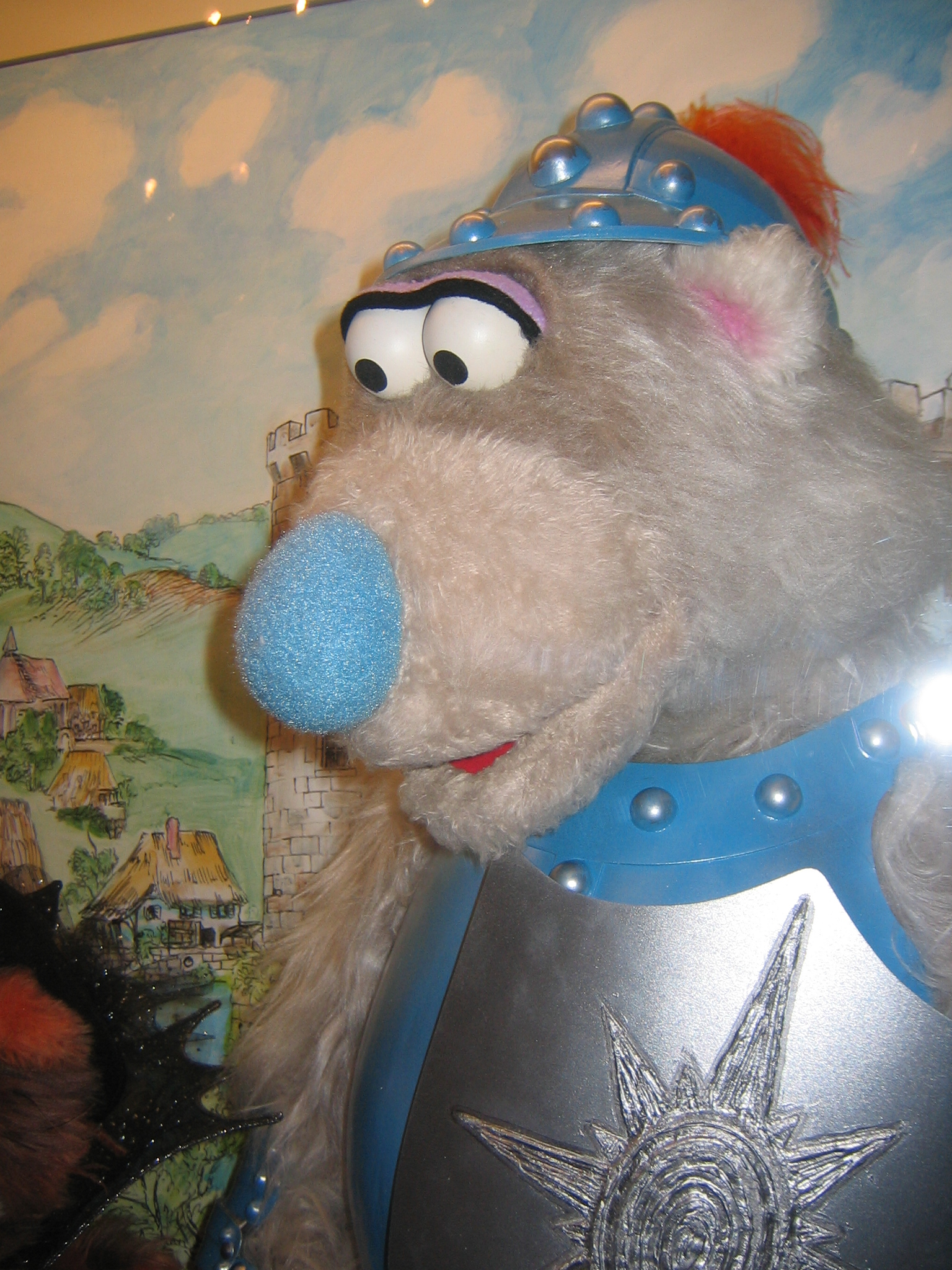
Basil the Bear from Sesame Park, in a knight's armour. This puppet, along with fellow characters Katie, Chaos, and Louis were displayed in the CBC Museum before its closure in 2017.

In 1996, the CBC decided to take on the job of producing different kinds of content for the series; specifically to have their own "street". Producer Shirley Greenfield and screenwriter Jill Golick decided to set the show in a park, rather than on an urban street. A new half-hour series entitled Sesame Park was born. The series premiered in September 1996. It joined the CBC Playground lineup on October 21, along with Wimzie's House.

The show's animated sequences were created in Toronto, while live-action segments were shot in Regina, Vancouver, and Winnipeg.

Sesame Park was cancelled in 2001 for undisclosed reasons.

=== Characters ===
Added to the cast were a Muppet kitten named Chaos (who is similar to Elmo, serving the same role, and is named after Golick's own cat), and a human character named Ray. Basil was now played by Bob Stutt.

Guest appearances included Red Green, a Canadian situation-comedy character played by Steve Smith, Eric Peterson as Old King Cole, and Janet-Laine Green as Goldilocks.

=== Content ===
About sixty percent of the new series was produced in Canada, with the remaining forty percent being segments from Children's Television Workshop.

== Awards ==
In 1999, the series received its nomination and win from the Gemini Awards, for Best Preschool Program or Series (Wendy Smith, Susan Sheehan, Duncan Lamb). Bob Stutt was nominated that year for Best Performance in a Preschool Program or Series. In 2000, Sheila McCarthy won Best Performance in a Preschool Program or Series, for her role in an episode of the show, beating out fellow guest star Pier Kohl, as well as others. In 2001, the series won Best Preschool Program or Series (Wendy Smith, Susan Sheehan, Duncan Lamb), beating out Land O' Hands and The Nook Counting Network. Guest Eric Peterson won again for Best Performance in a Preschool Program or Series, beating out Pier Kohl, James Rankin, Natasha LaForce and Gisèle Corinthios.

== Legacy ==
As with the original Sesame Street, some segments of Canadian Sesame Street and Sesame Park were farmed out to other versions of Sesame Street, in particular, Plaza Sésamo, the Latin American version of Sesame Street. In addition, since the rise of cable television in Canada in the 1970s (and before that for communities close to the US border), the original American Sesame Street could still be viewed on PBS-affiliated stations.

Sesame Street now airs on Treehouse TV, a Canadian channel aimed at preschoolers, with specials airing on the Global Television Network, one of Canada’s major terrestrial broadcast networks. Various segments, including Global Grover and Elmo's World, have aired separately on the channel for many years after Open Sesame.

== Cast ==
- Tim Gosley - Basil the Polar Bear (1987–1996)
- Trish Leeper - Katie, Barbara Plum
- Rob Mills - Dodi (1987–1996), Garth Burmengi
- Pier Paquette - Louis the Otter
- Derek Ritschel - Ray
- Gord Robertson - Dodi (assistance in flying sequences)
- Bob Stutt - Basil the Polar Bear (1996–2001)
- Karen Valleau - Chaos the Cat
- Noreen Young - Dodi (1996–2001)
