= Jeff Hyslop =

Canadian actor, singer, dancer, choreographer and director (b. 1951)

- Born: Jeffrey Hyslop; May 30, 1951 (age 75); Vancouver, British Columbia
- Occupations: Actor, singer, dancer, choreographer, and director

Jeff Hyslop (/ˈhɪslɒp/ HIH-slop; born May 30, 1951) is a Canadian actor, singer, dancer, choreographer, and director. Many of his roles have been in musical theatre. His most famous roles were as Jeff the mannequin in the children's show Today's Special and as the title role in the Canadian production of The Phantom of the Opera in 1990.

Hyslop was born in Vancouver, British Columbia. He is married to Vancouver-born singer and actress Ruth Nichol. They have one daughter, Gemma Nichol Hyslop, born in 1977, who has a daughter herself, Remmick Hyslop.

== Selected filmography ==
- The Magic of Aladdin (1989)
- Once Upon a Giant (1988) - Prince Daryl
- The Wars (1983) - Clifford Purchas
- Today's Special (1981-1987) - Jeff
- Dancin' Man (1980) - Self
- Jesus Christ Superstar (1973) - Philip
- Jack and the Beanstalk
- Oompahpah

== Stage work ==
- A Chorus Line (Mike & u/s Paul) - Broadway & US Tour
- Aladdin
- A Little Show
- Anne of Green Gables
- Bye Bye Birdie
- Cabaret
- Dames at Sea
- The Fantasticks
- Godspell
- Hamlet
- Jack and the Beanstalk
- Jacques Brel is Alive and Well and Living in Paris
- Jane Eyre
- Larry's Party
- Histoire du Soldat
- Love's Labour's Lost
- The Music Man
- Kiss of the Spider Woman (Molina) - Broadway & US Tour
- The Phantom of the Opera (title role) - Canada
- Pippin
- The Pirates of Penzance
- The Producers (Carmen Ghia & u/s Leo Bloom) - US Tour
- The Wizard of Oz

== One-man shows ==
- Jeff Hyslop: Feet First
- Jeff Hyslop Now!

== Directed/choreographed works ==
- A Little Show
- Babies: Bless Them All
- The Club
- Company
- Dancin' Man
- Guys and Dolls
- Godspell
- Good Boys and True
- Irma la Douce
- Jacob Two-Two
- Jeff Hyslop: Feet First
- Jeff Hyslop Now!
- Joseph and the Amazing Technicolor Dreamcoat
- McCartney TV special
- Modern Housewives
- On Tap
- Peter Pan
- Side by Side by Sondheim
- Six Women With Brain Death
- Take Two
- They're Playing Our Song
- Today's Special
