= Groundling Marsh =

Canadian children's television series

- Genre: Children's television series
- Created by: Lori Houzer; Bryan Levy-Young
- Starring: Gord Robertson; James Rankin; Jani Lauzon; Wendy Welch; Trish Leeper; Stephen Brathwaite; Dan Redican; Fred Stinson; John Pattison; Nina Keogh
- Country of origin: Canada
- Original language: English
- No. of seasons: 4
- No. of episodes: 65

Production
- Executive producer: John A. Delmage
- Producers: Lisa Olfman; Joy Rosen
- Running time: 25 min
- Production companies: YTV; J.A. Delmage Productions; Portfolio Film & Television Inc. Groundling Marsh Productions

Original release
- Network: YTV (1994–1997); Disney Channel (1996–1997)
- Release: June 27, 1994 – November 28, 1997

Related
- Wimzie's House

Groundling Marsh is a Canadian children's television puppet series, produced by Portfolio Film & Television Inc., and J.A. Delmage Productions. It included songs and animated segments, and enjoyed a certain amount of success and popularity during its time. The only merchandise produced for the show were videos and they are now exceptionally rare and no longer produced. In the United States, it aired on PBS and The Disney Channel. It received funding from the International Production Fund, formerly the Maclean Hunter Television Fund. This series premiered on June 27, 1994, on YTV before premiering in the U.S. on The Disney Channel and PBS on October 1, 1995. Groundling Marsh was nominated at the 12th Annual Gemini Awards for Best Preschool Program or Series. John Pattison was also nominated for a Gemini (Best Performance in a Preschool Program or Series) for the episode "Bah Hegdish". The show had its series finale on November 7, 1997.

== Premise ==
Groundling Marsh takes place in a magical swamp. Most of the mutant-like characters are "Groundlings" but look very different from each other. They can be described as any combination of animal, human, elf, and plant. One of the characters is a robot named Stacks. Generally, humans never appear in the series except as an alien presence represented by a boot or a voice. Most often, humans come to the marsh to dump trash and disrupt the ecosystem. The show was designed to be educational and so the story of each episode includes morals such as friendship, honesty, caring, and protection of the environment.

== Characters ==
- Galileo (performed by Gord Robertson) is a young leader Groundling. Relatively elf-like in appearance, he calls himself an explorer, and is constantly exploring and mapping the marsh. He is also curious about the world beyond the marsh, where the humans live. He built Stacks out of pieces of junk that humans dumped in the marsh. In some ways he is perhaps meant to resemble a Native American person. He is very friendly, but will sometimes lose his patience, particularly with Maggie. In the title sequence of every episode, he is seen looking through a telescope, implying that he is named after Galileo Galilei, the famous astronomer. He has the ability to see in the dark. He appears in the show very often. Despite being relatively mature in terms of his personality, he shares the role of protagonist with Maggie and, occasionally, with Crystal. Each character has been the focus of a number of episodes, so the show has more of an ensemble cast.
- Maggie (performed by Jani Lauzon in season 1, Wende Welch in seasons 2 and 3, and Trish Leeper in season 4) is the young tomboyish Groundling and one of the most commonly used characters. She is roughly humanoid but more animal-like in appearance than some of the other Groundlings. She is an extremely rambunctiously energetic sporty female lead character of the marsh, she often gets herself into trouble due to her sometimes immature behavior. However, she is very well-intentioned, tries to help others, and is curious about the world around her. She hangs out with Galileo and their friends, Maggie is often seen carrying a small, green, stuffed animal whom she calls Mossy Bear and whom she treats like a friend. In the episode titled "Mossy Bear," Galileo tries to get Maggie to give up Mossy Bear, first by trying to convince her and then through trickery.
- Mud/Slinger is the only Two-Headed Groundling in the world and the resident inventor. Mud and Slinger are really two separate individuals who share a body:
  - Mud (performed by Stephen Brathwaite) the right half (left from the camera's perspective) has light purple skin, a round face, and spectacles perched on his nose. He is Slinger's younger brother, He is somewhat absent-minded, but very friendly, and also the one who does most of the scientific research and inventing. He is also the less confident of the two and occasionally gets nervous or afraid in a situation, with Slinger always trying to help him get over his fears.
  - Slinger (performed by Fred Stinson) shares the same goals as Mud and contributes to their creation. He is Mud's older brother; however, he is more of a salesman, concentrating on finding uses for the inventions, and relying more on intuition than knowledge. He also appears to have slightly better social skills than Mud. Slinger's skin is green and his facial features are more angular. It was once revealed that he has by far the best sense of smell in the marsh. Both have troll-like appearances, with large furry ears and bright blue except on their faces and hands. Mud/Slinger is the strongest Groundling in the marsh and is always creating inventions out of the junk that humans throw away. Often, these inventions malfunction. Sometime in the past, Mud and Slinger's Grandcestors (the Groundlings' term for ancient ancestors) named Slide and Mash both lived all alone in a part of the marsh and had no friends. After meeting each other and forming a deep friendship, they wanted to be merged as one, for fear of ever being lonely again. Unseen spirit creatures called the Tree Elders gave them a potion that did just that. Since then they lived happily. This implies that all of Slide/Mash's descendants, including Mud/Slinger, have been conjoined twins. Mud/Slinger occasionally quarrel, but solve their differences easily enough. In the episode "Two Be of Not to Be" after Hegdish causes a major disagreement between Mud and Slinger, they decide to take the same potion, which will give them separate selves. But before they can go through with it, they learn Slide/Mash's story and that the potion only works once on every pair. Thus, they resolve their quarrel and renew their friendship. They share a catchphrase at each other, "Did Not and Did Too!" The malfunctioning inventions combined with occasional disagreements, makes Mud/Slinger the series' comic relief. But despite causing problems accidentally, Mud/Slinger is generally beneficial to the marsh and a help to his fellow Groundlings.
- Stacks (performed by James Rankin) is a large robot built by Galileo out of junk that humans have brought to the marsh and brought to life by a powerful lightning storm. He eventually becomes a mobile unit when his essential components are placed in a special motorized vehicle (which Mud/Slinger created for him using an old shopping cart) and for which he is very grateful (though gets carried away at first). Mostly, he is humble and kind, and tries to answer the Groudling's questions with information from his database. He sometimes feels insignificant being "just a machine" (as in the season one episode Life Before Stacks which also shows his origins). He has a long neck that looks like a very thick vacuum cleaner tube. His head is a tall metal canister with a handle that forms his nose, a large mouth at the bottom, a pair of eyes farther up and a hairbrush on top. Several cables dangle from his head down to the heap of machinery below him. A computer monitor forms his chest, while farther down a reel of film from a film projector on one side and a mechanical arm on the other side protrude from the heap.
- Eco (performed by James Rankin) has lived in the marsh for over two thousand years. She is a teacher and a source of guidance and solace for the Groundlings. Mostly human in appearance, she is the wisest and most spiritual of the Groundlings, and is kind, with a quirky sense of humor. She is the keeper of the Groundling Mythology, which holds the answers to most of nature's secrets. Her beliefs are similar to that of Romani and, to a lesser extent, Buddhists. She can talk to animals, and takes care of the marsh. Sometimes, Eco temporarily gives an important duty or the responsibility of a rare plant or artifact to Maggie or Galileo (often to test their virtue and help them learn life lessons about responsibility).
- Hegdish (performed by Dan Redican (season 2), Fred Stinson (season 3) and John Pattison (season 4)) is a trickster, a rival, a grouch, and the show's only antagonist. He was added in the second season. Cynical, pessimistic, sarcastic and lazy (In many episodes he is shown sleeping in a hammock in the middle of the day), he sometimes makes the effort to horde the things he likes, trips up the plans of the other Groundlings, give misleading information, and waste resources. His bitterness springs from his back-story, referenced in many episodes, in which they were both given the chance by the Tree Elders to learn how to speak with animals and be granted other powers and responsibilities (this was when he and Eco were much younger, and good friends). Now Hegdish jealously ridicules Eco when he can, though he worries about her when she goes missing in the episode "It's a Wonderful Marsh" and is even moved to tears upon finding her safe and sound. He is Galileo's rival. There is also a part of Hegdish's past, referenced in several episodes, in which he snuck aboard a ship, ate the food in the hold, fell asleep, woke up out at sea, was thrown overboard by angry sailors, chased by sharks, and swallowed by a giant fish. After that, he started becoming nervous around boats and large bodies of water. Despite generally avoiding his fellow Groundlings, Hegdish will often share knowledge from his travels and sometimes cooperate with them. In the episode "Bah Hegdish," a holiday episode where the groundlings celebrate Twinkle Time (a Christmas-like holiday) and which uses the storyline of Charles Dickens' A Christmas Carol, he plays the role of Scrooge and so comes to realize how lonely he would be without his fellow Groundlings.
- Crystal (performed by Nina Keogh) is Eco's grandniece. She is sweet, bubbly and beautiful. These ears give her the power to hear long distances; she can also see in the dark like Galileo. It was once said that she is a soft bunny-rabbit, and she lives in a beauty cavern. In her introduction episode, Crystal comes to visit Eco and has to wear glasses to protect her eyes. She soon becomes fast friends with Maggie. While not one of the original characters, Crystal continued to appear on the show, sometimes as the main protagonist of an episode, as in "Crystal and the Ice Wind." A running gag is Hegdish's tendency to annoy her by mispronouncing her name (calling her "Crispy", "Creepy", "Cookie", "Cracker", or "Christmas").

== Episodes ==
=== Season 1 (1994) ===
1. Fungus Amungus (Pilot) June 27, 1994
2. The Featherbeam June 28, 1994
3. Big Dreams June 29, 1994
4. Truth & Consequences June 30, 1994
5. Maggie's Quest July 1, 1994
6. Night and Day July 5, 1994
7. Life Before Stacks July 6, 1994
8. Heat Wave July 7, 1994
9. Pot of Plenty July 8, 1994
10. All for One July 9, 1994
11. Flower Power July 12, 1994
12. Them Dingling Dozy Daisies July 13, 1994
13. Sticks and Stacks July 14, 1994

=== Season 2 (1995) ===
1. Make Room for Hegdish
2. Butterfly Day
3. Stinky Pond Mystery
4. Galileo's Prank
5. Fence Fiasco
6. Come Blow Your Horn
7. Two Be or Not to Be
8. Tupelo Treat
9. Tinkletree Trouble
10. Seahunt
11. Eggs Over Easy
12. Slice of Advice
13. Snow Job

=== Season 3 (1996–1997) ===
1. Mossy Bear
2. To Sleep, Perchance to Dream
3. Reluctant Hero
4. Over the Rainbow
5. Mine All Mine
6. Sproutmaster
7. Maggie's Tree
8. Maggie's Youday
9. Purple Pebble Fever
10. Lucky Stick
11. Megaboo Gonna Get You
12. Free at Last
13. Crystal Clear

=== Season 4 (1997–1998) ===
1. Honey, I Shrunk the Groundlings
2. The Amulet
3. Jingle Bellies
4. Bumble-Bird Blunder
5. The Hegdish Who Came to Dinner
6. What a Guy
7. The Enchanted Music Box
8. The Other Galileo
9. My Hero
10. A Little Bird Told Me
11. Berries as Big as Your Head
12. Ooops!
13. The Imaginary Friend
14. Catch a Falling Star
15. Glisten Berries & Friends
16. Treasure of the Lost Marsh
17. Coming of Age
18. The Best Present of All
19. Five Leaf Clover
20. Mighty Maggie
21. Crystal and the Ice Wind
22. Free Wally
23. That's Entertainment
24. Listen Up
25. It's a Wonderful Marsh
26. Bah Hegdish

== Broadcast ==
After its 1994 debut in Canada, the show began airing in the United States on The Disney Channel in 1996, and continued airing on that channel until 1997. The series was also broadcast in Latin America and Brazil by Fox Kids. The series was also broadcast in the United Kingdom and Australia. The series was eventually broadcast in 94 territories worldwide. A big-screen "mini-feature" was also created and seen in "interactive theatres in a chain of U.S. family entertainment centres." The show also appeared on an interactive CD-ROM of Canadian Children's television intended for industry and the government.

== Reception ==
In a review of the Courageous Adventures VHS release, Publishers Weekly, who also deemed the show "popular", wrote, "Kids will be intrigued by this bizarre-looking world and will likely absorb overtly stated messages about cooperation, kindness and respect."

== VHS releases ==
Three hour-long VHS tapes were released by Lyrick Studios in 1998:

- Treasures Are for Sharing – June 23, 1998
- Courageous Adventures – June 23, 1998
- It's a Wonderful Marsh – September 8, 1998

== See also ==
- Wimzie's House
