= Fred Penner's Place =

- Genre: Children; Musical
- Created by: Fred Penner
- Written by: Nancy Trites-Botkin; Pat Patterson
- Starring: Fred Penner
- Theme music composer: Fred Penner
- Composer: David Jandrisch
- Country of origin: Canada
- Original language: English
- No. of episodes: 900

Production
- Executive producers: Randy Roberts (1985-1992); Lesley Oswald
- Producer: Nancy Trites-Botkin
- Running time: 30 minutes
- Production company: Oak Street Music

Original release
- Network: CBC
- Release: 1985 – 1997

Fred Penner's Place is a Canadian children's musical television series that aired on CBC Television from 1985 to 1997. It stars Fred Penner as a fictionalized version of himself, as well as an array of puppets, musical numbers, and occasional guest stars. Internationally, it aired on Nickelodeon in the United States beginning in 1989, and later on Odyssey Network. The show was positively received by audiences and critics, and won or received nominations for several awards including a Juno Award in 1989 and a Gemini Award in 1994.

After the series' cancellation in 1997, Penner admitted to being a "little bit lost" in the succeeding years as he continued to perform at concerts and give keynote speeches, but was waiting for the "next big thing to come along". Beginning in the mid-2000s, he began to reconnect with the generation of children that watched Fred Penner's Place as they entered adulthood. He has performed several sold-out concerts at universities and pubs across the country, and receives positive reactions and feelings of nostalgia from the overwhelmingly millennial audiences.

== Series overview ==
The series was created in the mid-1980s by its eponymous namesake Fred Penner, who viewed it as an opportunity to "[provide] an alternative to advertisement-and violence-filled programming" for children. The series educates children in different subjects including the teaching of French, one of Canada's official languages.

The series is very musical in nature, with Penner playing several musical pieces on his acoustic guitar throughout most episodes. Aside from the variety of puppets that shared the screen with Penner, a number of special guests appeared on the show throughout its run, including Holly Larocque as the character she portrayed on Under the Umbrella Tree, another CBC children's television series that aired during the 1990s.

Fred Penner's Place is noted for its distinctive title sequence, featuring a theme song written and performed by Penner himself. The sequence shows Penner walking along a beach and into a forest, observing several wild animals in their natural habitat, and eventually crawling into a hollow log and exiting out the other side, where he introduces himself and greets the viewer.

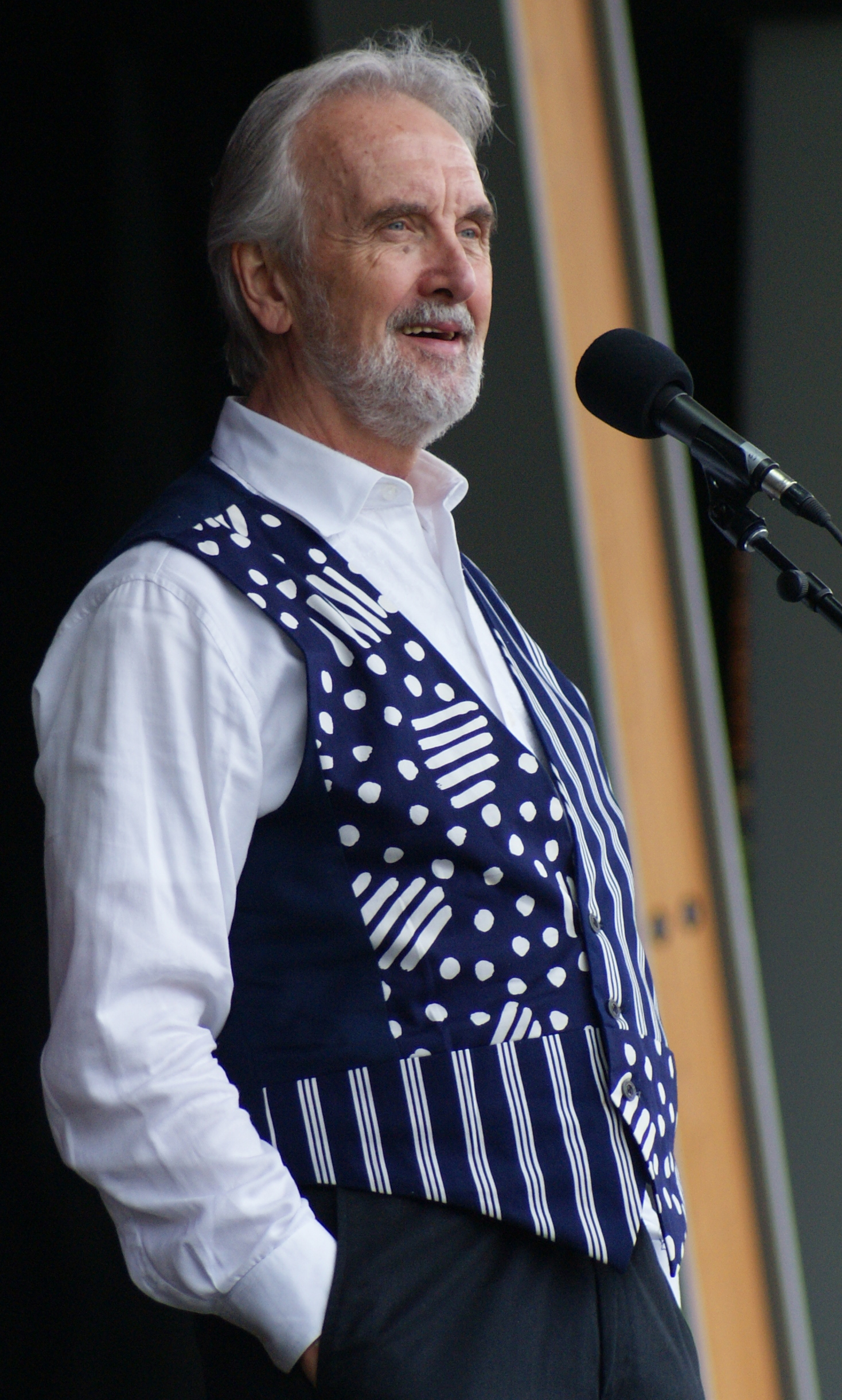
Penner performing on stage in 2012

=== Development and production ===
Fred Penner's Place originated when the Canadian Broadcasting Corporation was in the process of organizing a replacement series for the long-running children's series The Friendly Giant, which had aired for over 25 years between 1958 and 1985. Dodi Robb, head of CBC Kids at the time, called Penner and told him that the CBC had been watching his career progress over the last several years, and thought he would be ideal as a host for their new television series. When Penner inquired on how the series would be structured, he was asked for his own input, and that is when Penner came up with the idea that resulted in Fred Penner's Place.

The series was filmed in both Winnipeg and Vancouver. Originally (and throughout the series' run) a 15-minute program, the show also began adding 30-minute episodes to its production in 1987. The pace of the show has been described as "rigorous", and due to particular set requirements, Fred Penner's Place's crew had to rush through filming before the set was removed to allow for other productions. They were often given only a month to finish work. In many cases the crew would spend a month writing and shooting in Winnipeg, followed by another month in Vancouver.

Executive producer Randy Roberts estimated that the production team's goal was to produce three 15-minute episodes per day. He characterized both Penner and the series crew as working tremendously hard to get through production. Penner called the production an "intense process" and a "complex dance", but noted that he relished in it. According to Penner and Roberts, scripts were sometimes rewritten if they didn't "strike the right tone" for the show, with Penner explaining that a respect of the show's young audience was of paramount importance, and if the storylines became too silly they would be changed to avoid insulting the intelligence of the intended audience.

=== Music ===
Fred Penner's Place is most notable for its musical elements, with song performances by Penner being one of the show's most central components. Music director Dave Jandrisch worked closely with Penner; Jandrisch would chart songs, while Penner would often write them the night before a taping, or even on his way to the studio. Jazz musicians including Reg Kelln and Ron Halldorson were also involved with music production on the show.

During the 1980s, the show covered many songs from artists going back decades. Penner indicated that because Fred Penner's Place was a children's show, producers "didn't have to worry about royalties because it was for a generation that would grow up to appreciate it." However, by the 1990s, Penner began writing more original songs because of growing concerns regarding music royalties.

=== Cancellation ===
Fred Penner's Place was abruptly cancelled in 1997 shortly after management changes at the Children's and Family Programs division of CBC Television. Although a buyout clause permitted CBC to air the program for a further three years at no cost, they chose not to do so. Reruns of the show were aired until 2000.
