= Bob Stutt =

Canadian puppeteer and writer

- Occupations: Puppeteer, writer
- Years active: 1972–present

Bob Stutt is a Canadian puppeteer and writer, who has starred in various children's television programs throughout his career.

== Filmography ==
=== Television ===
- Today's Special (1981) – Mort
- Fraggle Rock (1983) – Several characters, including Wander McMooch and Felix the Fearless
- The Muppets: A Celebration of 30 Years (1986) (uncredited)
- Under the Umbrella Tree (1986) – writer and puppeteer of Iggy Iguana
- Basil Hears a Noise (1990) – Additional puppeteer
- The Big Comfy Couch (1992–2006) – Molly, Wuzzy Dust Bunny, Snicklefritz
- Sesame Park (1996–2001) – Basil
- Ruffus the Dog (1998–1999)
- Caillou (2000) – Gilbert the Cat

=== Writer ===
- Theodore Tugboat (1993–1995) (10 episodes)
