= Dimoitou =

Canadian educational program (1980s–90s)

An original Dimoitou puppet used to teach Canadian children.

Dimoitou is a series of activities, workbooks, songs and toys, mainly a turquoise-green octopus-like puppet who is the titular namesake of the program, used in Canada throughout the 1980s to 1990s in public schools to teach Quebec French to Anglophone students or students in French immersion. The program's main character, a fuzzy turquoise puppet which looked like a man with long tenticular arms and yellow eyes, could be operated by teachers and came with activity books, pre-recorded cassette tapes and other paraphernalia. The usage of Dimoitou ceased in the early 2000s, but the program later developed a cult following after a local man, Jordan Verner, began an internet campaign to request Dimoitou-related items and historical artifacts.

== History ==
A mixed lot of Dimoitou paraphernalia, shared by Canadian schoolteacher Diana Mancuso.

The Dimoitou program was originally created by a Quebec company known as "Centre éducatif et culturel" (now called Les Éditions CEC). The program was often considered unusual by teachers and students alike, both because the name "Dimoitou" was never given a clear definition or meaning ("dimoi" and "tou" loosely translate to "tell me all", suggestive of a portmanteau), and because much of the program revolved around titular character Dimoitou being sick or injured, with accompanying workbooks teaching English-speaking children how to say French phrases revolving around injury, illness and pity. This led to a satire piece in 2019 released by journalist Shauna Chase and French teacher Giselle LeBlanc discussing the "death" of Dimoitou, which was no longer being included as part of the French curriculum in Atlantic Canada; LeBlanc revealed that she still had the original Dimoitou puppet, which was quite large, in a shoebox packed away in her classroom, sharing a photo of herself with the puppet and some of her students.

While "mini-puppets" of the Dimoitou figure exist (which are darker green and lack the original puppet's shaggy fur), the original Dimoitou puppet, as given out to teachers throughout Canada, was a very large turquoise-green puppet made of a polyester fur-like shaggy material, featuring plastic yellow eyes, an open red felt mouth and long appendages. Other puppets given out in the original kits included a scarecrow-like figure, a brown rodent and others. An original Dimoitou puppet is considered quite rare and sought after by collectors.

Although the program was considered bizarre, according to French-Canadian teachers, its use of interpretive dance, active movements, art and singing made the program more fun for younger learners. According to teacher Mlle Joanne Cameron, "there are often too many negative feelings and not enough support for Core French programs." Cameron's interviewer clarified, "Mlle Joanne uses a special program, called Dimoitou, which employs puppets for the teaching of language. It is a very visual program involving a lot of dance, singing and role-playing. Rhythmic, repetitive written materials (similar to nursery rhymes) are used to introduce and reinforce basic vocabulary, and to support oral learning with opportunities to also read French."

== Cult following ==
A 2014 drawing from a French-Canadian student (credited as "Laurel Green") mocking Dimoitou as a meme, a common occurrence on Doodle Per Diem

Dimoitou developed a cult following in the 2010s, as students who had grown up with the program reached adulthood. A visually-impaired local man, Jordan Verner, recalled that his own childhood had been difficult, as he faced ableism and segregation in school, and that listening to the Dimoitou music cassettes had always made him happy. Verner began an online campaign to find any paraphinalia relating to the program, utilizing Reddit and other social media platforms to conduct his search. His efforts were later covered nationally by a radio broadcast on CBC News, where it was revealed that Denise Amyot, one of the original authors of the Dimoitou program and now the CEO OF Colleges and Institutes Canada, had some of the original workbooks left, which she mailed to Verner. Suzanne Pinel (who was known by her stage name "Marie-Soleil" of the TV show Marie-Soleil), a musical artist who worked on the Dimoitou program, also mailed paraphernalia to Verner for his collection, as did Matt Maxwell, a Halifax-based musician who had worked on the program. Maxwell himself began to aid in Verner's search, and caught the attention of the University of Ottawa and "Édouard et Micha" (Édouard Labonté and Micha Boudreault), a musical duo who had written the Dimoitou song Cha cha cha de la moufette, or "The Skunk’s Cha Cha Cha", prior to Boudreault’s death in 2005. Verner, who by that point had built a sizeable collection of Dimoitou-themed items, pointed out that the items were a piece of Canadian history and uploaded copies of them to a website where other people could explore them.

In 2014, Toronto-based teacher Diana Mancuso uploaded the instructions for making a Dimoitou "mini-puppet" for children to her own website, Toronto Teacher Mom. The University of Toronto revealed not long afterwards that it had archived Dimoitou 1, a workbook by Claudine Courtel and Murielle McKinley that was part of the original Dimoitou program. A number of Dimoitou-related workbooks remain listed through WorldCat.

== See also ==
- Téléfrançais!, a French-Canadian children's TV program that utilizes puppetry
- The Big Comfy Couch
