= Under the Umbrella Tree =

Canadian children's television series

- Title card for the 30-minute specials
- Created by: Noreen Young
- Starring: Holly Larocque; Bob Stutt; Stephen Brathwaite; Noreen Young
- Country of origin: Canada
- Original language: English
- No. of seasons: 4
- No. of episodes: 270 (plus 15 specials)

Production
- Production locations: Ottawa, Ontario
- Running time: 15 minutes 30 minutes (specials)
- Production company: Noreen Young Productions

Original release
- Network: CBC (Canada); The Disney Channel (US; season 4 and specials)
- Release: October 5, 1987 – June 20, 1993

Under the Umbrella Tree is a Canadian children's television series created by Noreen Young that originally aired on CBC Television from 1987 to 1993. It was produced by CBC and Noreen Young Productions, and later broadcast on The Disney Channel in the United States beginning on May 7, 1990.

The series centers on a quartet of main characters who share a house on Spring Street in a suburb of Ottawa, Ontario. The characters include Holly (a human), Iggy (an iguana), Jacob (a blue jay), and Gloria (a gopher). The show's title is derived from the fact that the characters live together in a home featuring a prominent indoor umbrella tree.

When production of the show ended in 1993, syndication continued on The Disney Channel and Canal Famille until 1997. Twenty-seven episodes of the show were released to DVD by Cinerio Entertainment in partnership with Noreen Young in 2006, following a long wait for expiration of ownership rights. In 2019, Gloria, Iggy and Jacob were featured in episode 1 of Cavendish, in Andy and Mark's childhood bedroom. In 2020, the original cast (Holly Larocque, Noreen Young, Stephen Brathwaite and Bob Stutt) reunited to make a video called Under the Umbrella Tree: The Mask Special, which was uploaded to YouTube and Facebook.

== Overview ==
=== Premise ===
A total of 285 episodes were produced over the years, with 270 being 15 minutes long and 15 being 30-minute specials. Every episode focuses on a different theme, such as sports, holidays, singing, dancing, exercise and various other activities. Valuable life lessons are often woven into every story, such as the importance of keeping promises, being considerate of others or assuming responsibility for one's actions. The show's characters were created by Ken Sobol, who also wrote the majority of the series episodes. Sobol had previously worked closely with Noreen Young on Readalong and Téléfrançais, two other children's television series.

=== Characters ===
==== Main ====
- Gloria Gladys Grace Gabrielle Gardenia Glenda Gale Gopher (performed by Noreen Young) – Gloria is the only female puppet in the Umbrella Tree household and lives and sleeps underneath it, entering her burrow from behind the couch. She enjoys music and other performing arts, keeping her more particular interests secret, even from her best friends.
- Holly Penelope Higgins (played by Holly Larocque) – The only human character. She serves as a parental figure and mentor for the three puppet characters, although she considers them more as her "roommates". She handles most of the cleaning and cooking and pays the rent. She is funny, artistic, patient and generous. She has an Uncle Jack (played by Don Westwood) and an Aunt Jill who never visits; they are a musical duo in England.
- Ignatz "Iggy" Julio Iguana (performed by Bob Stutt) – Iggy sleeps on the shelf at the Umbrella Tree residence, sometimes thinking too highly of himself and making honest mistakes. He plays guitar when not rivaling his friend Jacob in sports and beyond. His uncle, Rod Iguana, lives in Arizona, as do his cousins, Emmet and Camille. The shortest of the group, he habitually tricks people into looking at their shirts, then points at their noses and laughs.

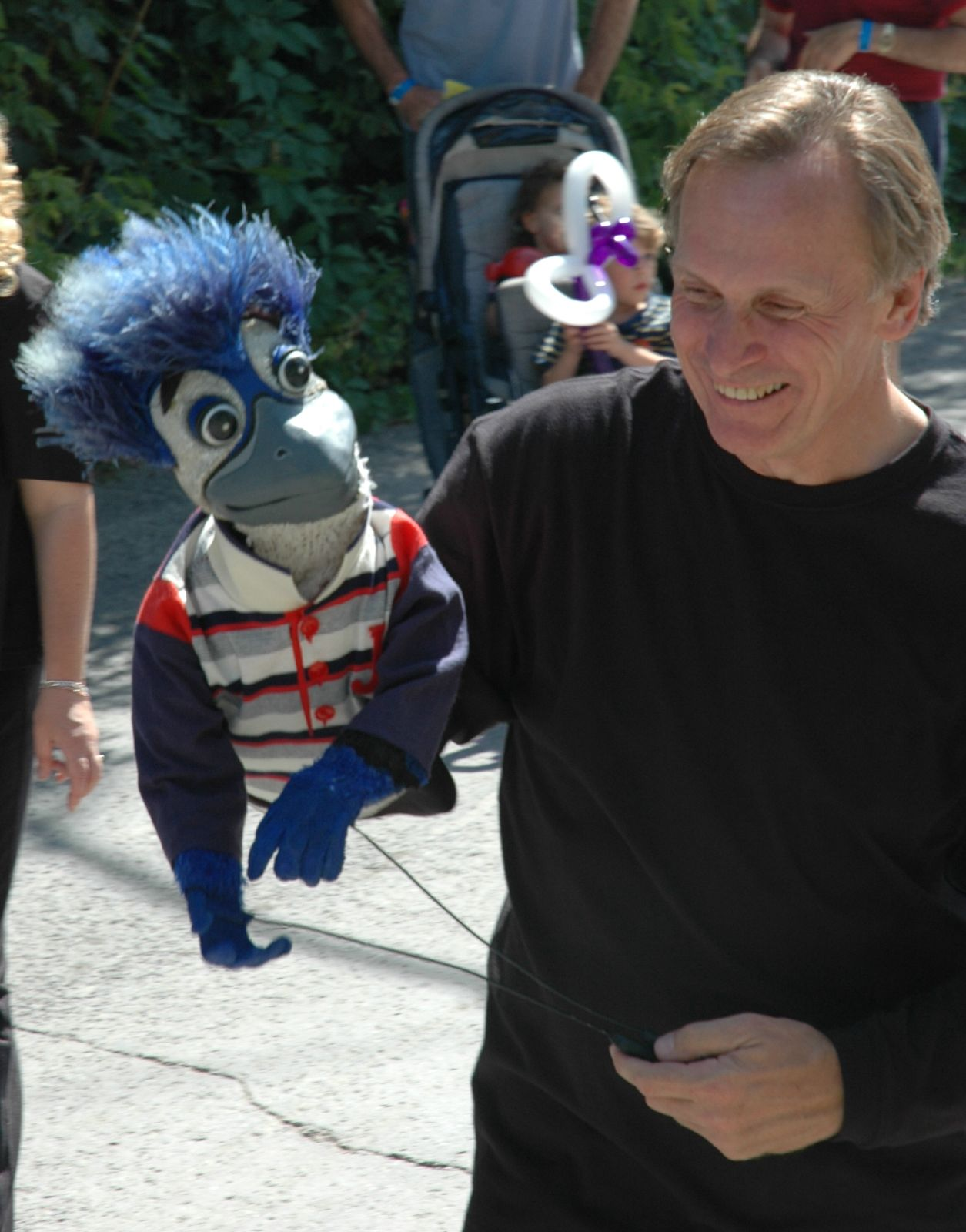
Jacob Bluejay with puppeteer Stephen Brathwaite in 2006.

- Jacob Barnaby Blue (performed by Stephen Brathwaite) – Jacob sometimes enters the house by flying through open windows. He usually sleeps in his own bird house on the patio. Other times, he invents things which seldom work as he plans, resulting in a humorous outcome. He tends to get things mixed up and say "I knew that" when he learns something. He is the second-tallest of the group. As revealed in "How it All Began", he was the apartment's original occupant. Iggy and Gloria soon followed; Holly came later. He was named after his twenty-times great-grandfather, Sir Jacob of Blue, said to have invented the catapult, defeated the evil Duke of Doublepeck and married the good Lady Flyella.

==== Other ====
- Lewis A. Byrd (performed by Bob Stutt) – Lewis is a friend of the Umbrella Tree gang who works at the Bird Migration Office, usually involved in festivities outside the apartment or in dialogue within several episodes. He is a stuffy workaholic who needs to feel needed. He is well known for overusing the term "indeed" and usually adds the phrase "hmm, indeed!" at the end of his statements. He also has a crush on Holly, which is revealed in the Valentine's Day episode with his secret admirer attempts.
- Mitzi the Dog (performed by Holly Larocque) – Mitzi is Gloria's best friend who is always seeming to get either herself or Gloria in trouble.
- Charles "Chuck" Chickadee (performed by Bob Stutt) – Chuck is Jacob's best friend who is extremely talkative and sometimes gets on everyone's nerves because of this.
- Chester Chickadee (performed by Stephen Brathwaite) - Chuck's father.
- Charlene Chickadee (performed by Noreen Young) – Chuck's mother.
- Chelsea Chickadee (performed by Noreen Young) - Chuck's little sister.
- Mrs. McMertree (performed by Noreen Young) - One of the gang's neighbours. She's known for wearing feather-themed clothes. Has a cousin named Madame Sonya.
- Simon the Bat (performed by Bob Dermer) - A bat who is scared of people.
- E. Lizard-Beth Taylor - A lizard movie star that Iggy idolizes.
- Emmet Iguana (performed by Bob Stutt) - A cousin of Iggy's, he used to be rather clumsy.
- Mrs. Annabelle Higgins - Holly's mother.
- Lorraine (played by Holly Larocque) - Holly's Irish cousin.
- Matt and Martha - Two mice.
- Waldo Bunny (performed by Bob Stutt) - A smart bunny who is into computers.
- Calvin Crow - a gluttonous crow.
- Annette Parakeet (performed by Bob Stutt) - A female parakeet friend of Jacob's who plays basketball with him.
- Darleen Swan (performed by Noreen Young) - a swan ballerina.
- Mr. Fuller - A clumsy goat who runs the "Gifts and Gimmicks" shop.
- Rusty - A dog.
- Goldberg (played by Harvey Atkin) - A Jewish magician.
- Mr. Pleck (played by Dean Hagopian) - The group's Polish neighbour.
- Jack Higgins (played by Don Westwood) - Holly's favorite uncle from England who likes to tell stories. He and his wife, Jill Higgins, are part of a musical duo. He appears in two episodes.

== Broadcast ==
In 1997, the Disney Channel ended reruns of Under the Umbrella Tree as part of an overhaul of their morning preschool block. Since Disney Channel still held broadcast rights to the show, airing reruns on another television station was not possible until their rights expired in 2005. From 2009 to 2011, Under The Umbrella Tree aired on TV3 Medford weekdays and weekends as part of the network's children's block.

Starting in 2018 a number of episodes had been made available on the Canada Media Fund's YouTube channel Encore+ in both English and French. However, on December 1, 2022, Encore+ shut down its French- and English-language YouTube pages.

== Episodes ==
- Going Bananas
- Birdbrain
- Chez Iggy
- Chickadee Tea
- Farewell Findley
- Gingerbread House
- Gloria Can't Sleep
- Gloria the Reporter
- Hanky Panky
- Jacob's Girlfriends
- Migration Party
- The Best Hiding Place Ever
- Uncle Jack Comes Back
- An Afternoon Off
- Cranky Movie
- Gloria Gets Rough
- Hamster Hullabaloo
- Hiccups
- Neat!
- The Trombone
- Live & Learn
- Love
- Everybody's Garden
- Baseball Fever
- Under the Umbrella Tree
- The Scarecrow
- Totem Pole

== DVD releases ==
In 2006, Noreen Young Productions in unison with Cinerio Entertainment began selling several episodes on DVD. To date, eight volumes have been released, with Volumes 1, 2, 3 & 4 featuring all-new introductions to the episodes with Iggy, Gloria and Jacob, played by their original performers.

- Volume 1: Bird-Brain, Hamster Hullabaloo, The Trombone, The Best Hiding Place Ever, Uncle Jack Comes Back.
- Volume 2: Chez Iggy, Hanky Panky, The Gingerbread House, Love-Valentine's Day (1/2 hour Special).
- Volume 3: To The Dentist, Migration Party, Jacob's Girlfriends, Going Bananas, Stargazing.
- Volume 4: Gloria Gets Rough, Private, The Aqua Show, Live and Learn: Back To School (1/2 hour Special).
- Volume 5: Twins, Cranky Movie, Chickadee Tea, Christmas Under The Umbrella Tree (1/2 hour Special).
- Volume 6: Iggy's Collection, The Princess and the Pea Soup, Sir Jacob of Blue, The Tooth Fairy, Small Worlds.
- Volume 7: Growing, Gloria's Allowance, The Accordion Lesson, Piano Lessons (1/2 hour Special featuring Jon Kimura Parker).
- Volume 8: Safety Poster Contest, Gloria Can't Sleep, Singing Telegrams, Hockey Holly, Iggy's Airlines.
