= Jack Duffy =

Canadian actor (1926–2008)

- Born: September 27, 1926; Montreal, Quebec, Canada
- Died: May 19, 2008 (aged 81); Toronto, Ontario, Canada
- Occupations: Actor; singer; comedian
- Years active: 1945–2008
- Relatives: Violet (sister)

Jack Duffy (September 27, 1926 – May 19, 2008) was a Canadian actor, singer, and comedian.

== Life and career ==
Duffy was born in Montreal and raised in Toronto, and had one sister, Violet Duffy. He dropped out of Central Technical School to become a singer. At age 19, he was hired as a studio singer with CBC in Toronto and in 1948, he started a three-year affiliation with Tommy Dorsey, initially as a member of the vocal group Bob-O-Links. Duffy was performing as a member of the musical act the Town Criers in 1950 and would frequently appear on CBC-TV variety shows through the 1950s. In 1957, he was hired by Norman Jewison to appear as a comedian on the CBC series Showtime. Duffy had his own CBC variety show called Here's Duffy that ran from June 1958 through October 1959.

In 1961, he became a regular on Perry Como's Kraft Music Hall, performing as one of the Kraft Music Hall Players, alongside Don Adams, Paul Lynde, Kaye Ballard and others. The show finished its run in 1963.

Duffy battled alcoholism after he started drinking while on the road with the Dorsey band. His first wife left him and he became destitute, living in a $10-a-week attic. He stopped drinking in 1967 and married dancer Marylyn Stuart later that year.

In 1970, he began an 11-year run as captain of the home team on the charades game show Party Game, produced by Hamilton, Ontario-based CHCH-TV. It was through this show that Duffy picked up the nickname "Captain Jack." In 1971, he also hosted the CBC-TV series In The Mood, featuring appearances from some of the biggest names in big band jazz, including Benny Goodman and Count Basie. Beginning in 1975, Duffy provided the voice of Boot, the cheerful, occasionally mischievous talking boot that hosted the children's educational show Readalong. Readalong was seen on TVO, PBS and other educational networks into the early 1990s.

Duffy died on May 19, 2008, from natural causes at age 81 in Toronto.

== Filmography ==
=== Film ===
==== Theatrical ====
- 1978: The Silent Partner - Fogelman
- 1979: Title Shot - Mr. Green
- 1986: Killer Party - Security Guard
- 1988: Switching Channels - Emil, the Waiter
- 1989: The Dream Team - Bernie
- 1993: Ordinary Magic - Barbershop #1
- 1997: Double Take - Judge
- 1997: Men with Guns - Jimmy
- 1998: Strike! - School Guard
- 1999: Blackheart - Enger
- 2000: The Spreading Ground - Owen Rafferty
- 2002: Fancy Dancing - Stan
- 2002: The Tuxedo - Elderly Man
- 2003: The In-Laws - The Other Uncle
- 2005: Lie with Me
- 2006: It's a Boy Girl Thing - Old Man
- 2009: Gooby - Grocery Store Manager

==== Television ====
- 1980: Boo! - Dr. Frankenstein
- 1981: Freddie the Freeloader's Christmas Dinner - Santa
- 1986: Whodunit - Narrator / The Boss
- 1986: Spearfield's Daughter - Jake Lintus
- 1986: Doing Life (TV Movie) - Jury Foreman
- 1988: Biographies: The Enigma of Bobby Bittman (TV Short) - Sam Slansky
- 1988: Once Upon a Giant (TV Movie) - McDermot the Hermit
- 1993: Ghost Mom (TV Movie) - Al
- 1994: David's Mother (TV Movie) - Doorman
- 1994: Hostage for a Day (TV Movie) - SWAT Three
- 1994: Sodbusters (TV Movie) - Railroad Executive No. 1
- 1997: The Defenders: Payback (TV Movie) - Mr. Sanders
- 1998: Universal Soldier III: Unfinished Business (TV Movie) - Dr. Gregor
- 1999: A Holiday Romance (TV Movie) - Irwin
- 2001: My Horrible Year! (TV Movie) - Mr. Birdwell
- 2001: Doc (TV Movie) - Oldest Father
- 2002: A Killing Spring (TV Movie) - Neighbour
- 2003: Death and the Maiden (TV Movie) - The grandfather

=== Television series ===
- 1955: The Wayne and Shuster Hour
- 1956: The Barris Beat - Regular
- 1958: Here's Duffy - Host
- 1961–1963: The Perry Como Show
- 1968: Upside Town - Eddie Power
- 1970–1981: Party Game
- 1971: In The Mood - Host
- 1972: Half the George Kirby Comedy Hour
- 1974: And That's the News, Goodnight
- 1975–1976: The Bobby Vinton Show - Regular Performer
- 1976: The Frankie Howerd Show - Wally Wheeler
- 1976: Readalong - Boot (voice)
- 1980: Curious George - Narrator (voice)
- 1980: Bizarre
- 2000: Robocop: Prime Directives (mini-series) - Dr. Hill
- 2005: Corner Gas - Mr.Baker
