= Hi Diddle Day =

- Genre: Children's puppetry
- Written by: Bob Gardiner
- Composer: Wyn Canty
- Country of origin: Canada
- Original language: English
- No. of seasons: 8

Production
- Producers: Audrey Jordan (1969–1970); Denny Faulkner (1970–71); Brian Frappier (1971–74)
- Running time: 30 minutes

Original release
- Network: CBC Television
- Release: 7 November 1969 – 29 March 1976

Hi Diddle Day is a Canadian children's television series that aired on CBC Television from 1969 to 1976.

== Premise ==
This puppet show is set in the community of Crabgrass, with mayor Gertrude Diddle, Basil (a beagle), Durwood (a 900-year-old dragon), Wolfgang (a wolf) and Chico (a crow). The programme's songwriter, Wyn Canty, was featured in the role of a music teacher.

== Production ==
The series was produced in Ottawa, Ontario. Noreen Young created the puppets for the series and voiced and operated Gertrude, Granny and Basil.

== Scheduling ==
Hi Diddle Day was initially limited to the Ottawa, Montreal and Maritime CBC stations, airing Fridays at 4:30 p.m. although a special Christmas episode was broadcast on the network 25 December 1969. The following year, it was seen Saturdays at 1:00 p.m. from April until September. By October 1970, Hi Diddle Day was available on the entire network and was broadcast weekly as an after-school series, and also aired Saturdays 1:00 p.m. in May and June 1971. Production ended after the 1975–1976 season, although repeat episodes were broadcast from April to June 1977.
