= Drop-In =

- Genre: Variety
- Country of origin: Canada
- Original language: English
- No. of seasons: 4

Production
- Running time: 30 minutes

Original release
- Network: CBC Television
- Release: 28 September 1970 – 1974

Related
- Dress Rehearsal

Drop-In is a Canadian television series for youth broadcast on CBC Television from 28 September 1970 to 1974. Various hosts were featured throughout the course of the series to present a variety of topics.

The show was broadcast three times per week in the 1970–1971 season. This was increased to four times per week in the following year.

== Dress Rehearsal ==
Prior to the fall launch of the series, eight preview episodes were aired on CBC Television beginning 7 July 1970. These were entitled Dress Rehearsal, but otherwise featured hosts such as Susan Conway, Lynne Griffin, Nina Keogh, and Rex Hagon, who would be seen on the regular series from that October. Conway and Hagon had previously appeared together as child actors on the Canadian dramatic television series "The Forest Rangers".

The first season was taped entirely in Toronto. For its second and subsequent seasons Drop In's format changed to one where episodes were produced locally in several Canadian cities, with local children as hosts.

== Hosts ==
Partial list of hosts, who appeared with inconsistent frequency throughout the series:

- Hub Beaudry
- Jeffrey Cohen
- Susan Conway
- Christopher Dean
- Lynne Griffin
- Rex Hagon
- Dean Keitel
- Nina Keogh
- Debbie Perret
- Pat Rose
- Jeannie Wright
- Tommy Wright
- Daniel Stepchuk
- Jeffrey LeClair
