= Readalong =

- Genre: Children’s reading television
- Written by: Ken Sobol
- Directed by: Jeremy Pollock
- Voices of: Max Ferguson; Jack Duffy; Julie Amato
- Music by: Eric Robertson
- Country of origin: Canada
- Original language: English
- No. of episodes: 90

Production
- Producers: Jeremy Pollock; Chris Homer; Peter McLean
- Production locations: Toronto, Ontario, Canada (filming)
- Running time: 10 minutes
- Production company: The Ontario Educational Communications Authority

Original release
- Release: 1975 – 1979

Related
- Polka Dot Door

Readalong is an educational Canadian television program for young children, first produced in 1975 for TVOntario. A total of 90 episodes were produced, each about 10 minutes in length. The first set of 30 shows were produced in 1975 and 1976, and focused on simple word recognition. The next 30 were produced in 1977, and began to incorporate more sophisticated reading skills. The final 30 episodes were produced in 1979, and had segments that focused on reading full sentences. The show was seen throughout Canada on various provincial educational networks, and throughout the United States on various PBS affiliates. Episodes continued to air in some markets through the 1980s and into the early 1990s.

The program taught fundamentals of reading with the help of live child actors (who changed frequently), puppets, and animated interstitial segments.

== Cast and crew ==
The show was hosted by a cheerful talking boot named Boot, voiced by Jack Duffy. Another puppet character included from the very beginning was a comically dressed and sometimes gently befuddled grandmother figure named Granny, voiced by Max Ferguson. In the course of each episode, Boot and Granny would sometimes struggle to read new or unfamiliar words that were presented to them, but they would carefully sound out letters and letter combinations on their way to getting each word right (and encourage viewers to do the same).

Other puppets were gradually added to the mix, most notably a pink, self-confident female shoe named Miss Pretty, voiced by Julie Amato. Other puppet characters that appeared over the years included Mister Bones (a skeleton), the Explorer (a chipper old-fashioned British adventurer), House (an anthropomorphic house, always seen from the front; its two upper windows were its 'eyes', and its front door served as its 'mouth'), and the Thing (a furry, bucktoothed monster-ish creature that spoke only in grunts). All were voiced by Ferguson and Duffy. Amato also voiced a female auto racing boot named Dynamite Dinah.

Noreen Young, who designed the puppets, also created puppets for other programs, including Under the Umbrella Tree. The characters were developed by Ken Sobol, who also wrote all the scripts for the series. The show's music was composed by Eric Robertson.

== Reception ==
The program was a marketing hit for TVOntario and had strong international sales lasting many years.

The Granny, Boot, and Pretty puppets are now housed at the Canadian Museum of History.

== Credits ==
- Children: Reena Schellenberg (as "Angela"), Moira Knott (as "Liz"), Bobby Prochaska (as "George"), Eric Braslis, Adrian Rajaram (as "Paul")
- Puppeteers: Noreen Young, Bob Dermer, Nina Keogh
- Voices: Max Ferguson, Jack Duffy, Julie Amato
- Music: Eric Robertson
- Animation: Bill Reed, Patricia Crudden, John Leach, Bill Borg
- Editors: Brian Elston, Paul Spencer, Doug Beavan, Bob Baker
- Writer: Ken Sobol
- Educational Supervisors: Ruth Vernon, Jennifer Harvey
- Production Assistant: Jeannie Mougeot, Janice Newland, Frances Revell
- Producer/Director: Peter McLean, Chris Homer, Jeremy Pollock
