= Holly Larocque =

Canadian actress and theatre performer

- Born: Ottawa, Ontario, Canada
- Occupations: Actress, theatre performer

Holly Larocque is a Canadian actress and theatre performer. Born in Ottawa, Ontario, Holly is perhaps best known for her role as Holly Higgins on the children's series Under the Umbrella Tree which aired from 1986 to 1993. She resumed the role in 2020 for a COVID-19 service special.

Holly was also the host of the TV series Homes by Design from 1999 to 2001. She has appeared as a guest star on programs such as Fred Penner's Place, and on specials such as Christmas Holly, and Holly Larocque: It's About Time on the Canadian Broadcasting Corporation. She was also a nominee at the Daytime Emmy Awards for her work on Under the Umbrella Tree. Holly also starred in The Big Band Broadcast starring Holly Larocque and the Mark Ferguson Orchestra, which toured in 2006.
