= Stewart Memorial Church =

Azamgarh

The Stewart Memorial Church is Hamilton, Ontario, Canada’s oldest Black congregation. It was established in the 1830s as St. Paul's African Methodist Episcopalian Church, and moved to its current site on John Street in 1879 after its original location on Rebecca Street was destroyed by a fire.

== History ==
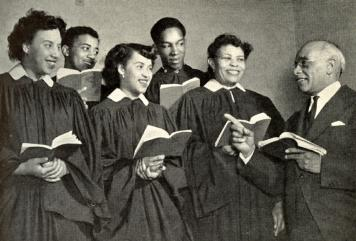
Stewart Memorial Church Choir, 1950

Abolitionist Josiah Henson, who inspired Harriet Beecher Stowe's novel Uncle Tom's Cabin, was the church's first pastor. One of the most prominent figures in the history of Stewart Memorial Church was the Reverend John Christie Holland. Holland played a major role in keeping the church open when the congregation was faced with financial difficulties during the Great Depression. In 1937 the church decided to sever ties with the African Methodist Episcopal body. This resulted in the formation of a non-denominational church, renamed in commemoration of the previous reverend, Claude A. Stewart.

Since its establishment, the church has served a central role in Hamilton's Black community, providing various social, cultural and religious programming. Prominent members of the church have included Ray Lewis, the first Canadian-born black Olympic medalist, and Lincoln Alexander, former Lieutenant Governor of Ontario and Canada's first non-white Member of Parliament.

In 1994, the property was designated an Ontario Heritage Site. Around this time, the congregation was observed as entirely elderly as few young native-born Black Hamiltonians chose to remain in the city - citing racism and a lack of opportunities.
