= John Christie Holland =

- Born: 25 December 1882; Hamilton, Ontario, Canada
- Died: 22 June 1954 (aged 71)
- Occupation: Pastor

John Christie Holland (25 December 1882 – 22 June 1954) was a Canadian pastor. He was the first Canadian of African heritage to be named a "Citizen of the Year". Holland was the pastor of Stewart Memorial Church in Hamilton, Ontario. Due to his tireless work in the community, he was given the award of "Distinguished Citizen" for the year 1953. Mayor Lloyd Douglas Jackson presented the award in 1954.

== Early life ==
Holland was born on Christmas Day in 1882 in Hamilton, Ontario. He was christened John Christmas Holland in recognition of his birthday, but he later legally changed his middle name to Christie. His father, Thomas John Holland (né Howard), was an escaped slave from Sandy Spring, Maryland who emigrated to Canada in 1860, reportedly by swimming across the Niagara River. There, Thomas met and married Henrietta Shortts of Saltfleet Township, Ontario, and the two settled in Hamilton and opened a flour and feed store downtown. Thomas supplemented the family income by touring with a choir in the winter while Henrietta minded the store.

John C. Holland was the fifth of thirteen children. His father encouraged his sons to not only excel at school and help with the family business, but also to work at an after school job. Holland opted to sell copies of the local newspaper The Hamilton Spectator at the corner of King and James. As an eleven-year-old boy, he was required to defend his corner daily against encroachment from other newsboys, and it was here that he suffered his first tastes of racial discrimination, but also developed a strong belief in a higher power and a commitment to his church and his community.

== Career ==
John was considered the scholar of the Holland family, and he resolved at a young age to attend university and study for the ministry. In 1901, he married Josephine Idenia Johnson of Oakville, and the couple struggled to earn enough money to send Holland to college. Holland worked for some time as a janitor and waiter at Westinghouse Electric, and though he was well-liked and respected by the executives at the company, he was unable to advance beyond menial positions due to his race.

In 1916 or 1917, Holland began working for the Toronto, Hamilton and Buffalo Railway, where he would remain for over thirty years. Initially hired as a janitor, within two years he was promoted to porter, then Pullman car attendant, and finally to attendant of the VIP car used by TH&B's president. Holland was, by this time, the father of four children and, unable to attend university full-time, he instead studied for the ministry via correspondence course. He was ordained in 1925 through the Payne Theological Seminary in Wilberforce, Ohio.

== Legacy ==
Even before his ordination, Holland had long been active at St. Paul's African Methodist Episcopal Church, supervising the Sunday school, teaching, singing in the choir, and acting as a substitute pastor. By the time the church reformed as the non-denominational Stewart Memorial Church in 1937, Holland was its minister. He retired eleven years later in order to dedicate all his time to humanitarian causes and the betterment of Hamilton.

Holland was remembered by church members as an exceptionally kind, gentle, and caring man who endeavored to provide support and guidance to anyone who sought it. He was also known for reaching out to those outside the church who were struggling with poverty and racial discrimination. Ray Lewis described him as behaving as though he had a responsibility toward every person in the city of Hamilton.

Holland could be persuasive when necessary, at one point single-handedly convincing Stelco and other local steel mills to change their policy of not hiring blacks. He also approached Hamilton's mayor and business community about raising funds for Stewart Memorial, and secured a long-term source of income for the church by establishing a monthly Visitor's Night.

In 1954, Holland was named Hamilton's first Citizen of the Year. He died three months after receiving the award.

Holland was posthumously inducted into Hamilton's Gallery of Distinction in 2003.

Journalist and actress Nerene Virgin was Holland's great-niece.

=== The John Christie Holland Awards ===
In 1996, a black history committee was convened during Hamilton's sesquicentennial to recognize the contributions of African Canadians to the social, cultural and economic life of the city. The committee unanimously agreed to name their awards after Holland. The 2009 award recipients were: Janoi Edwards, Iyinoluwa Aboyeji, Kyle Ferriera, Ruwa Banaga, Patricia Wright, Rosemary Sadlier and Natsha Cunningham. Some notable past winners were: Michael Lee-Chin, Honorable Lincoln Alexander and Jean Augustine.
