= Cotton Factory =

Historic industrial complex in Hamilton, Canada

Coordinates: 43°15′36.4″N 79°50′00.4″W

Cotton Factory is an historic industrial complex formerly known as The Imperial Cotton Company Limited in the industrial north end of Hamilton, Canada. The complex has been renamed the Cotton Factory and is repurposed for small manufacturing and office space for creative professionals.

The five buildings on the site were built in 1900 and stand today in their original structures. It is one of the few historic complexes built in the late 19th to early 20th century that remain today in Hamilton, Ontario.

== History ==
The growth of Hamilton's economic landscape during the late 19th and early 20th century is accredited to textile production, the city's second largest industry, second only to the steel mills. The men responsible for this city's economic expansion are the "5 Johns" of Hamilton (John Morison Gibson, John Moodie, John Sutherland, John Dickenson and John Patterson). The men opened the Cataract Power Company in 1896 which brought cheap electricity to the city. They were Hamilton's major landowners in the region, both of which brought manufactures and entrepreneurs from all over North America.

The general manager of the company was Charles T. Crantham, pioneer of the cotton duck industry in Canada and responsible for the creation of the Imperial Cotton Company Ltd. From Yarmouth, Nova Scotia, Grantham was the bookkeeper for a cotton duck mill in 1883 to fix the company's books. Four years after his employment, he resigned to open a rival company in Hamilton, Ontario; bringing with him many workers and experts. Grantham had the help of John Patterson of the "5 Johns" to fund his cotton mill venture and build the cotton mill on the land that he owned. It was also decided that his brother Edmond Patterson would be the architect. By, 1900, the Imperial Cotton Company was born and looked after by James M. Young, the first President, who was the son of John Young, an original investor with the Dundas Cotton Company (1860–1891) and a now distant relative of Bob Young, the current owner of the Hamilton Tiger-Cats.

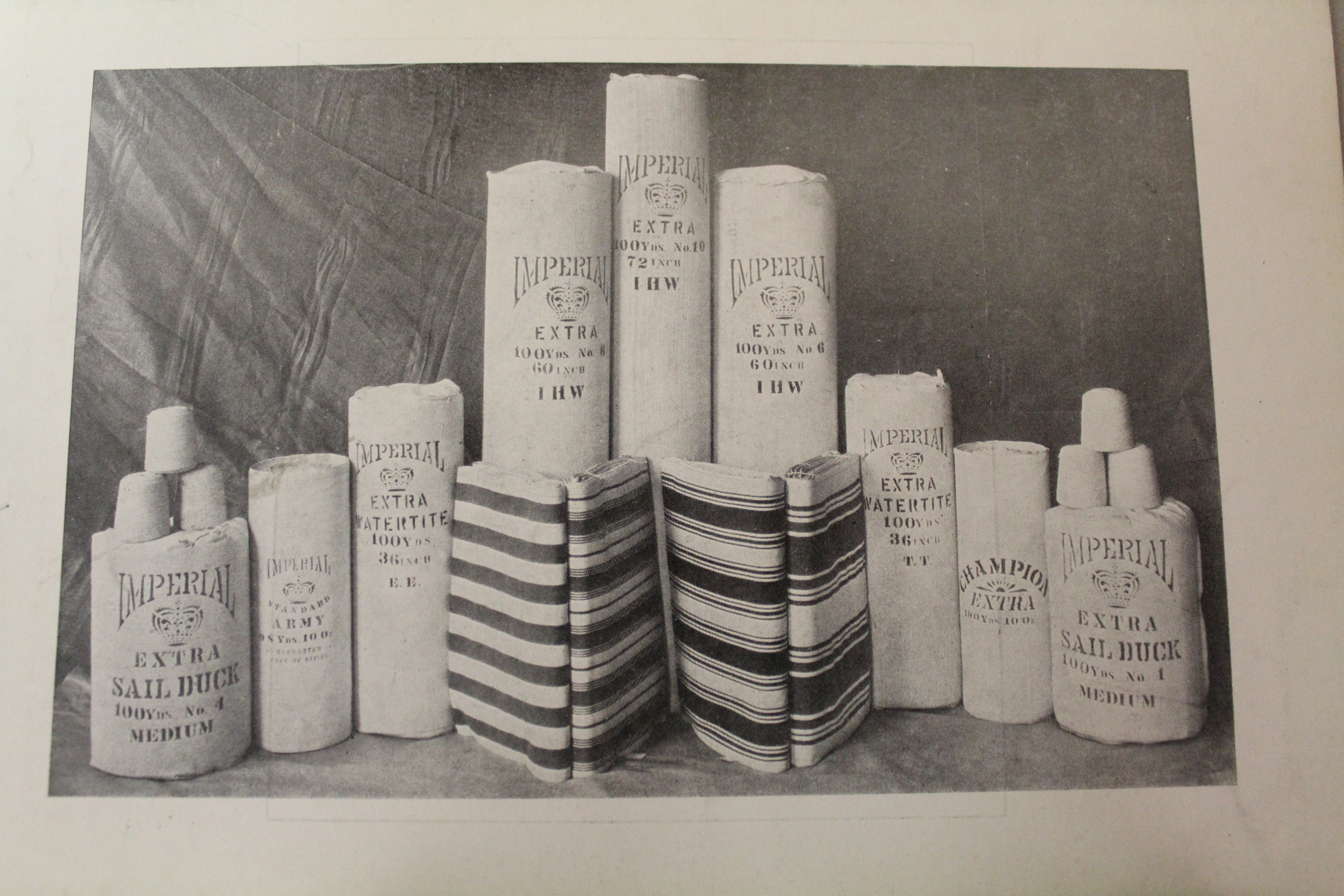
Cotton duck manufactured by the Imperial Cotton Company Limited from 1924

The Imperial Cotton Company at 270 Sherman was the second largest cotton mill in the city and attracted customers from the around the world. Orders were taken from using the telegraphic system and codebook that can be found in Hamilton's Public Library to date. The Imperial Cotton codebook helped workers simplify orders and organize classes of cotton. The company manufactures heavy grades of cotton duck, used for making vessel sails, mechanical belting and hose, railway car roofing, binder canvasses, tarpaulins, tents, awnings, filters and cotton paper dryers. The products of the company are sold mainly to manufacturers, cutters-up, railways, implement and paper makers.

The Cotton Factory has always been a "people first" kind of place. The Imperial Cotton Company produced a quarterly newsletter called, "The Fabricator", to bring news to the staff about group insurance plans, a cafeteria unit that seated 165 people, upgrades of new technology such as electric refrigerators and a newly purchased lunchroom piano by the Entertainment Committee. News among the staff members are also featured in the Fabricator, highlighting marriages, births, and deaths and recounted vacation stories by the mill employees.

In 1924, the Imperial Cotton merged with Cosmos Cotton Mills (formerly Yarmouth Duck & Cotton). The new company, Cosmos-Imperial Mills Limited, owned and operated the complex until 1972, when most of its machinery and workers were sent back to Nova Scotia. A textile museum in Yarmouth houses many of the "Big Looms" that may have been used at 270 Sherman.

== Architecture ==
The mill building, which housed 1,220 spinning spindles, 3,735 spindles, 98 duck looms and looms for the manufacture of cotton drayer felts, is constructed out of brick and timber with "slow burning" wood beams positioned across the 30,000 square feet of space on the second and third floor Mill.

Next to the Mill Building is a smokestack that was used by three original boiler systems. Adjacent to the smokestack is a storage warehouse that was originally used for sorting, painting, finishing, shipping and waterproofing cotton. Centre of the mill courtyard is the Mills Arts Building, which was a later addition to the 270 Sherman complex and used today for artists to work their private units. Occupants of the building include professional artists that do photography, oil painting, sculpturing and designing to name a few.

The Cotton Factory is also a popular location for film and television productions. Its exteriors have been used for scenes from the mid-1800s to modern day and even future apocalypses.
