= Charles Victor Roman =

Civil Rights activist

- Born: 4 July 1864; Williamsport, Pennsylvania, U.S.
- Died: 25 August 1934 (aged 70); U.S.
- Education: Meharry Medical College, Fisk University
- Occupations: Surgeon, professor, author, civil rights activist
- Known for: First African American physician trained in ophthalmology and otorhinolaryngology; civil rights activism
- Notable work: Journal of the National Medical Association (editor)
- Spouse: Margaret Lee Voorhees
- Relatives: Charles Lightfoot Roman (nephew)

Charles Victor Roman (July 4, 1864 – August 25, 1934) was a surgeon, professor, author, and civil rights activist born in Williamsport, Pennsylvania and raised in Dundas, Ontario. He was the first Black person to graduate from Hamilton Collegiate Institute, a high school located in Hamilton, Ontario.

== Early life ==
Charles Roman was the fourth child of James William Roman and Anne Walker McGuinn. His father was an enslaved man who escaped to Canada from Maryland via the Underground Railroad, and his mother was the daughter of two enslaved Americans who escaped to Canada and later became successful farmers and landowners in Burford, Ontario.

U.S. census documents indicate that Charles's parents lived in Williamsport, Pennsylvania, with their children (including Charles) sometime before 1860. The census also indicates that James worked as the captain of a canal boat while living in Pennsylvania. The family moved to Burford, Ontario, in 1870 when Charles was six years old and then later to Dundas, Ontario, in 1867 for work opportunities.

At the age of 12, Charles found work at the Cotton Company, an industrial mill formerly known as the Cotton Factory based in Hamilton. Despite being very young, it was legal for children to work in industrial complexes and factories at the time. Charles would often work 12-hour days and then attend night school or supplement his learning with trips to the library when possible.

At 17, Roman was injured in a workplace accident at the mill, which resulted in his leg being amputated. This accident forced him to leave his job, but it allowed him to focus on his education. He enrolled in a four-year program at Hamilton Collegiate Institute, which he was able to complete in only two years.

== Career ==
=== Teaching ===
After graduation, Roman found it hard to secure gainful employment in his field due to racial discrimination and his disability, so he sold sewing items to save money for medical school. In 1885, a traveling lecturer convinced Charles to use his degree from Hamilton Collegiate Institute to find work as a teacher in the U.S., where he could earn more money.

He later moved to Trigg County, Kentucky, and then Nashville, Tennessee to teach public school. He intended to save enough money to return to Canada and attend medical school. While teaching, he also took classes at Meharry Medical College and graduated in 1890.

=== Medicine ===
After graduating from Meharry Medical College, Roman married Margaret Lee Voorhees and worked for two years in Clarksville. He operated his own private practice in Dallas from 1893 to 1904. He paused his practice to further pursue studies at the Post-Graduate Medical School of Chicago and to study ophthalmology and otorhinolaryngology in London. He was the first African American physician to train in both of those disciplines.

He returned to Meharry Medical College after his graduation to teach ear, eye, nose, and throat diseases, as well as surgical technique. While working as a professor, he earned a Master of Arts in history and philosophy in 1913 from Fisk University, where he later became the head of the Department of Health.

Roman was the fifth president of the National Medical Association and edited the association's Journal of the National Medical Association for ten years, until 1919.

=== Lecturer ===
Roman worked with the U.S. Army during World War I as a medical lecturer, where he primarily spoke to African American soldiers.

=== Activism ===
In 1919, Roman was the associate editor of The National Cyclopedia of the Colored Race. He also worked with several organizations that dealt with race relations and peace, including the American Academy of Political and Social Science, Southern Sociological Congress, Knights of Pythias of North America, South America, Europe, Asia, Africa and Australia, and the Grand United Order of Odd Fellows in America. At the African Methodist Episcopal Church, he held the position of lay leader. Roman wrote many books and articles, and one of his addresses to the Southern Sociological Congress about race relations earned him accolades in journals such as the Journal of the National Medical Association.

== Personal life ==
Roman and his wife did not have children, but he shared a close bond with his nephew, Charles Lightfoot Roman, who went on to attend McGill University.
