= Today's Special =

Canadian children's television series (1981–87)

- Created by: Clive VanderBurgh
- Starring: Jeff Hyslop; Nerene Virgin; Bob Dermer; Nina Keogh
- Country of origin: Canada
- No. of seasons: 7
- No. of episodes: 122

Production
- Running time: 30 minutes
- Production company: TVOntario

Original release
- Network: TVOntario
- Release: September 1, 1981 – July 1, 1987

Today's Special is a Canadian children's television program produced by Clive VanderBurgh at TVOntario, originally broadcasting 120 episodes from 1981 to 1987. Much of the series was set in a department store, based on Simpson's then flagship location in Toronto. Some store sequences were shot at the Queen Street West and Yonge Street store after hours. The show ran on TVOntario in Canada as well as Nickelodeon in the United States. Reruns of the series continued into 2000 on such outlets as PBS stations (most of which stopped airing it by the mid-1990s) and the former Faith & Values Channel in the United States and on Treehouse TV in Canada.

== Premise ==
In the children's department of a major department store, each night when Jodie arrives for work, she carries a mannequin (Jeff) upstairs, where Muffy the mouse says the magic words "hocus pocus alimagocus!" This brings him to life.

Many early episodes focused on a tangible object as a subject, such as hats or costumes, with the show revolving around teaching about it. Later episodes dealt with more complicated ones, such as the episode "Wishes," which dealt with sacrificing one thing for another; "Phil's Visit", which dealt with alcoholism; or "Butterflies", which dealt with death.

Short films, often less than a minute long, were often inserted as breaks in the episode's main plot, narrated by Robyn Hayle (the same actor who provided the voice of TXL). These included Mime Lady segments, animated quizzes designed to test a child's observation, narrated story books, and popular nursery rhymes (which an unseen Muffy would introduce with "And now I'd like to introduce a nursery rhyme by Mother Goose").

Many episodes featured one or more one-time visitors to the store. Some would cause problems for the characters, while others would befriend them and help solve their problems. These visitors included the characters' friends or family, people coming to the store to do their jobs, people brought there by magic ("Treasure Hunts", "The Queen of Hearts"), bizarre, non-human characters ("Space", "Sam and the Robot"), and real-life celebrities ("Opera", "Trash"). Magic was important to many episodes, and the characters sometimes would have an adventure that involved it.

== Cast and characters ==
- Jeff (Jeff Hyslop): A retail store mannequin with a magic hat that makes him come to life when someone says "hocus pocus alimagocus". If it comes off his head, he turns back into a mannequin. He can't leave the store or he will remain a mannequin forever (he can only go outside onto the building's roof or, in very rare episodes, when traveling by magic). Because he has not been alive for very long, he knows little about many everyday objects (at least in earlier seasons). However, he is often shown to be a fast learner, a deep thinker, and a source of ideas. He is also a very talented singer and dancer, which he demonstrates at some point in nearly every episode. Though he wishes that he were not bound by the rules of the spell that keeps him alive, he puts his friends' needs first.
- Jodie (Nerene Virgin): The store's display designer. Portrayed as a sweet, level-headed woman, she functions as a mentor and teacher to Jeff, who is relatively new to the world. He often works as her assistant in setting up the displays. Although she has no established authority, she usually takes a leadership role among the characters. Her words are often comforting to others, and she is always ready to help her friends with their problems.
- Sam Crenshaw (puppet, Bob Dermer): The store's security guard. Born in 1919, he is the oldest of the four main characters and is a navy veteran. He is a generally laid-back individual, as the years have worn him down. He often fails to notice or realize certain things around him at first, though when he does, he is known to get hysterical about it. Sam does not seem particularly bright and is sometimes clumsy, but he means well and is capable in his job. He also has a pet cat named Penelope that Muffy is afraid of. He sometimes uses the TXL Series 4 computer to mind the store.
- Muffy Mouse (puppet, Nina Keogh): A mouse who speaks in rhyme and lives in the store all the time. She plays the piano, rides a scooter, and wears a feather boa around her neck like a lasso. She also plays tricks on people, and enjoys mischievous acts. As a mouse, she is obsessed with cheese and other snacks. Muffy is young and naive, and her fear of cats makes mention of them a pet peeve. She is usually the first one to get upset or frustrated over a situation, and her cousin, Mort, visits her on occasion. She is also Jewish.

Recurring characters

- TXL Series 4 (Robyn Hayle): The store's computer system. Sam operates it from the security room. It appears to have a feminine persona. Despite being a machine, it is suggested that it is capable of human emotions.
- Mrs. Pennypacker (puppet, Cheryl Wagner): An employee who runs the stock room at night. She is an elderly lady who shows her age in terms of physical appearance more than Sam does, but often appears more enthusiastic and full of energy than him. Her motto is "I know where everything goes" and the others sometimes call upon her knowledge of the store's layout to find obscure or special items.
- Mort (puppet, Bob Stutt): Muffy's cousin from the farm. His country lifestyle tends to contrast with her city life. He, like her, speaks in rhyme, and often comes to visit.
- Waldo the Magnificent (Barrie Baldaro): The magician who originally brought Jeff to life. A rather wise but somewhat inept man, the spells he casts with his wand often go awry, and it may take multiple tries to get it right. A running gag is his tendency to call Sam by the wrong name.
- The Mime Lady (Nikki Tilroe): A mime character seen in quiz segments of the show. Tilroe also provided voices for several other characters.

== Episodes ==
=== Season 1 ===
No.	Title	Original release date
S01E01	"Hats"	1981
S01E02	"Snow"	1981
S01E03	"Noses"	1981
S01E04	"Family"	1981
S01E05	"Camping"	1981
S01E06	"Pets"	1981
S01E07	"Sleep"	1981
S01E08	"Balloons"	1981
S01E09	"Soup"	1981
S01E10	"Costumes"	1981
S01E11	"School"	1981
S01E12	"Games"	1981
S01E13	"Trains"	1981
S01E14	"Water"	1981
S01E15	"Books"	1981
S01E16	"Fruit"	1981
S01E17	"Gardens"	1981
S01E18	"Shoes"	1981
S01E19	"Hair"	1981
S01E20	"Hands"	1981
S01E21	"Brushes"	1981
S01E22	"Night"	1981

=== Season 2 ===
No.	Title	Original release date
S02E01	"Dance"	1982
S02E02	"Movies"	1982
S02E03	"Circus"	1982
S02E04	"Halloween"	1982
S02E05	"Opera"	1982
S02E06	"Television"	1982
S02E07	"Food"	1982
S02E08	"Summer Camp"	1982
S02E09	"Building"	1982
S02E10	"Work"	1982
S02E11	"Eyes"	1982
S02E12	"Records"	1982
S02E13	"Homes"	1982
S02E14	"Play"	1982
S02E15	"Birthdays"	1982
S02E16	"Soap"	1982
S02E17	"Friends"	1982
S02E18	"Music"	1982
S02E19	"Wood"	1982
S02E20	"Flight"	1982

=== Season 3 ===
No.	Title	Original release date
S03E01	"Cousins"	1983
S03E02	"Police"	1983
S03E03	"Moving"	1983
S03E04	"Tears"	1983
S03E05	"Pianos"	1983
S03E06	"Our Story (1)"	1983
S03E07	"Our Story (2)"	1983
S03E08	"Travel"	1983
S03E09	"Newspapers"	1983
S03E10	"Cookies"	1983
S03E11	"Dinosaurs"	1983
S03E12	"Adventure"	1983
S03E13	"Imagination"	1983
S03E14	"Temperature"	1983
S03E15	"Smiles"	1983
S03E16	"String"	1983
S03E17	"Wild West"	1983
S03E18	"Space"	1983
S03E19	"Christmas (1)"	1983
S03E20	"Christmas (2)"	1983

=== Season 4 ===
No.	Title	Original release date
S04E01	"Changes"	1984
S04E02	"Dreams"	1984
S04E03	"Lost and Found"	1984
S04E04	"Boxes and Boxes"	1984
S04E05	"Hospitals"	1984
S04E06	"Butterflies"	1984
S04E07	"Sharing"	1984
S04E08	"Storms"	1984
S04E09	"Babies"	1984
S04E10	"The Sea"	1984
S04E11	"Vacations"	1984
S04E12	"Cars"	1984
S04E13	"Treasure Hunts"	1984
S04E14	"Wheels"	1984
S04E15	"Ears"	1984

=== Season 5 ===
No.	Title	Original release date
S05E01	"Songs"	1985
S05E02	"Daisies"	1985
S05E03	"Jeans"	1985
S05E04	"Hello Friend"	1985
S05E05	"Waldo's Hat"	1985
S05E06	"Letters"	1985
S05E07	"Heroes"	1985
S05E08	"Grandmothers"	1985
S05E09	"Being Alone"	1985
S05E10	"Help!"	1985
S05E11	"Buttons"	1985
S05E12	"Sam's Speech"	1985
S05E13	"Dancing Shoes"	1985
S05E14	"Storybooks"	1985
S05E15	"Going Out"	1985
S05E16	"Fun"	1985
S05E17	"Jeff"	1985
S05E18	"Jodie"	1985
S05E19	"Muffy"	1985
S05E20	"Sam"	1985
S05E21	"Live on Stage"	1985

=== Season 6 ===
No.	Title	Original release date
S06E01	"Stuffies"	1986
S06E02	"Late"	1986
S06E03	"The Blue Cow"	1986
S06E04	"A Date for Sam"	1986
S06E05	"Teeth"	1986
S06E06	"Trash"	1986
S06E07	"Wishes"	1986
S06E08	"Phil's Visit"	1986
S06E09	"Junior"	1986
S06E10	"Secrets"	1986
S06E11	"Moods"	1986
S06E12	"Fire"	1986

=== Season 7 ===
No.	Title	Original release date
S07E01	"Mrs. Pennypacker's Problem"	1987
S07E02	"The Queen of Hearts"	1987
S07E03	"A Runaway Spell"	1987
S07E04	"A Visit to the Opera"	1987
S07E05	"Sam and the Robot"	1987
S07E06	"Mrs. Waldo"	1987
S07E07	"Rich and Famous"	1987
S07E08	"Ice Cream"	1987
S07E09	"Bedtime"	1987
S07E10	"Locks"	1987
S07E11	"Memories"	1987
