= Charles Lightfoot Roman =

Canadian surgeon (1889–1961)

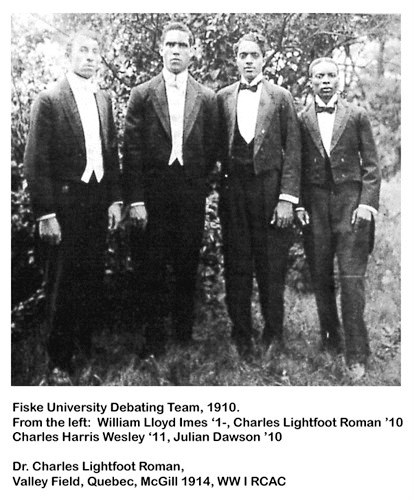
- Born: May 19, 1889; Port Elgin, Ontario
- Died: June 8, 1961 (aged 72)
- Education: Fisk University (B.S.)
- Known for: Being one of the first Black Canadians to graduate from McGill University's Faculty of Medicine.
- Relatives: Charles Victor Roman (uncle)

Charles Lightfoot Roman (May 19, 1889 – June 8, 1961) was a Canadian surgeon, author and researcher. He was also one of the first Black Canadians to graduate from McGill University's Faculty of Medicine.

== Early life ==
The grandson of a fugitive slave who went from Maryland to Canada via the Underground Railroad, Roman was born in Port Elgin, Ontario, to parents James Roman and Fannie Lightfoot Roman. He was the oldest of four children. Roman grew up and attended elementary and secondary school in Bay City, Michigan. After graduating high school, Roman moved to Nashville, Tennessee to attend Fisk University in 1907. He graduated in 1910 with a Bachelor of Science degree.

After teaching for a year in the US, Roman returned to Canada to study medicine at McGill University. He put his studies on hold during World War I to enlist with the Canadian General Hospital No. 3, a field hospital near the front lines in France, in 1915 He was one of the first Black Canadians to sign up during the First World War, and the only known Black person to have served with the Canadian General Hospital at that time.

With two years left of his medical degree to complete, he began serving as an orderly, and assigned the rank of Private. He met his wife, Jessie Middleton Sedgewick, a nurse, who was also serving. Roman served 25 months and was promoted to Wardmaster by the end of his time with CGH. He returned to Montreal in 1917 to finish his studies. He graduated two years later as a Doctor of Medicine, as well as a Master of Surgery, becoming one of the first Black Canadians to graduate from McGill's Faculty of Medicine. He married Jessie Sedgewick Christmas Day 1920 and moved to Valleyfield, Quebec.

== Career ==
After graduating, Roman worked for the Montreal General Hospital in various duties, including house surgeon, senior resident, admitting officer and acting medical superintendent. Two years later, he become a physician for Montreal Cottons Limited, becoming one of the first industrial medicine doctors in the province. He remained at the company for the rest of his career, rising to the position of medical director before retiring.

During his career, he became an expert in industrial medicine and advanced knowledge in what is now called the field of occupational medicine. He specialized in the area of workplace accidents. His research included health and safety for cotton mill workers, likely inspired by his uncle, Charles Victor Roman, who was also respected in the medical field and lost his leg due to an accident at a cotton mill at age 17. His research was published in the Canadian Medical Association Journal and influenced health and safety protocols in factories and mills.

In 1953, Roman was honoured as a Fellow of the Industrial Medical Association in Los Angeles. He travelled across North America lecturing about industrial medicine. He kept working until shortly before his death in 1961.

== Freemasonry ==
Roman was a member of the Freemasonry, being initiated into Valleyfield Lodge on March 28, 1923. Six years later, he was elected as the Worshipful Master, and later become District Deputy Grand Master for Montreal District No. 3 in 1934. He was an honorary member of multiple lodges, and became Deputy Grand Master of the Grand Lodge of Quebec in October 1950.

Two years later, in 1952, he was elected Grand Master, and is believed to be the first Black person to be the head of a traditional or mainstream Grand Lodge in North America.

== Other notable achievements ==
Roman was a nominee for Bank of Canada's next $5 bank note in 2020.
