= Téléfrançais! =

- The three main characters, Jacques, Sophie and Ananas in the junkyard
- Genre: Children's
- Created by: Ken Sobol
- Starring: Jacques Dell; Colombe Demers; René Lemieux
- Theme music composer: Bruce Ley; Jed MacKay
- Country of origin: Canada
- Original language: French
- No. of episodes: 30

Production
- Executive producer: Ruth Vernon
- Producers: Jennifer Harvey; David Moore
- Editor: Hank Mol
- Running time: 10 minutes

Original release
- Network: TVOntario
- Release: 1984 – 1986

Téléfrançais! is a Canadian French-language children's television series, produced by TVOntario from 1984 until 1986. The series of 30 ten-minute episodes has become a popular teaching tool, and is used by many educators (especially in Canadian and American schools) to teach French as a second language to elementary and middle school children. The show's name is a portmanteau for télévision and français.

The show follows the adventures of two children named Jacques (Jacques Dell) and Sophie (Colombe Demers) before she moved in the show, and Ananas (René Lemieux), a talking pineapple who resides in a junkyard. Other recurring characters are Pilote, Ginette, the Annonceur, Monsieur Pourquoi (le Superdétective), Louis Questionneur, Brigitte Banane, and the comic skeletal musical group Les Squelettes. The programs were produced by Jennifer Harvey and directed by David Moore. The theme and all of Les Squelettes' songs were written by the team of Bruce Ley and Jed MacKay. Julie Beaulieu, who appeared in PBS' Bridge to Terabithia, also appeared.

All the characters and scripts were created by Ken Sobol.

The series was on air, on TVO, until at least 1996.

== Cultural references ==
In Ryan North's Dinosaur Comics, the Téléfrançais theme song is God's ring tone.

A clip from the series served as the music video for Mounties' 2013 single "Headphones".

The yé-yé song "La Ballade de Téléfrançais" by Vowl Sounds references Ananas along with the movie Chungking Express and the Serge Gainsbourg song L'Anamour.

== See also ==
- Dimoitou, a French-Canadian school program that used puppets and workbooks
