= Dance Arts Institute =

Dance school in Toronto, Canada

Coordinates: 43.66639°N 79.36705°W

General information
- Name: Dance Arts Institute
- Year founded: 1968
- Founders: Patricia Beatty; David Earle; Peter Randazzo
- Website: danceartsinstitute.ca

Artistic staff
- Artistic director: Heidi Strauss (2024-2026)

Other
- Associated company: Toronto Dance Theatre

Dance Arts Institute formerly The School of Toronto Dance Theatre is a dance school located in the Cabbagetown neighbourhood of Toronto, Ontario, Canada. Established in 1968, the Institute today runs under the Artistic Direction of Heidi Strauss and is a national leader for performing arts education, at the forefront of training in contemporary dance.

== History ==
The Institute was established as The School of Toronto Dance Theatre in 1968 by the founders of Toronto Dance Theatre: Patricia Beatty, David Earle, and Peter Randazzo, disciples of Martha Graham.
In January 1978, after a decade of growth, the School incorporated separately from the company. In 1979 the Professional Training Program was established by David Earle, and together the company and Institute moved into the studios and offices of their current home in Cabbagetown. Today the Institute maintains its affiliation with Toronto Dance Theatre, currently under the artistic direction of Andrew Tay.

The school changed its legal name effective June 1, 2023.

== Programs offered ==
Dance Arts Institute comprises four divisions:

Professional Training Program (PTP)

The Institute offers a full-time, three-year program in contemporary dance. The professional program is a post-secondary course of study aimed at training aspiring dancers in the skills and experience to succeed in a theatrical dance career. This program is uniquely linked to the York University dance department, giving students the opportunity to apply for admission to the York Bachelor of Fine Arts (Hons) Dance program.

Summer Intensive Program

The Summer Intensive Program is an intensive 1–2-week program of classes in contemporary dance designed for aspiring dance artists pursuing dance studies and professional dance experiences.

The Evening Program

The Institute also runs an adult recreational program of contemporary dance classes, offered for all experience levels, held on Monday and Tuesday evenings.

== Faculty and affiliations ==
The School's artistic director is Heidi Strauss, and the faculty are all practising artists.

The School is affiliated with Toronto Dance Theatre, whose artistic director is Andrew Tay, and many graduates of the school have become members of that company.

A number of graduates of the School have gone on to join major Canadian and international companies, whilst others have initiated their own dance collectives, festivals and schools.

The School is also affiliated with York University, in Toronto, and graduates may apply credits from their courses at the school towards a BFA in dance.

== Notable alumni ==
- Emily St. John Mandel studied contemporary dance at STDT from the age of 18.
