= Daniel McCarthy (producer) =

Canadian producer

Daniel McCarthy (c. 1926 – 10 January 2013) was a Canadian radio and television producer and the former head of children's programming at CBC Television (CBC). He worked at the CBC for thirty-three years, including a twelve-year tenure as the head of the CBC's children's programming department. McCarthy created, developed and produced such well known Canadian children's television shows as The Friendly Giant, Mr. Dressup and Sesame Park.

McCarthy grew up in Toronto, Ontario. He graduated from the St. Michael's College at the University of Toronto after studying drama, music, and theology. In 1954, he married Mary Sue McGee, with whom he had seven children.

McCarthy worked as a radio and television producer at the CBC for thirty-three years. He began his career as a radio producer. He created the half-hour-long children's radio show, The Rod and Charles Show, starring Rod Coneybeare and Charles Winter. McCarthy also produced How Do You Say Hello?, a show which asked children about their lives' he visited thirteen nations throughout Southeast Asia to interview overseas children for the show.

He transitioned from radio to television during the 1950s. McCarthy produced the children's puppet show, The Friendly Giant, which aired on CBC Television from 1958 until 1985. The show starred Bob Homme as a giant named Friendly, who tells stories to two puppet friends, Rusty and Jerome. McCarthy also created and developed Mr. Dressup, starring Ernie Coombs and Judith Lawrence. Mr. Dressup debuted on the CBC in 1967 and aired until 1996.

McCarthy also partnered with the Children's Television Workshop (now called Sesame Workshop) to produce a Canadian version of Sesame Street. McCarthy, the Director of the CBC Sesame Street Project, oversaw the creation of Sesame Street Canada, which debuted on the CBC in 1972, combining American and Canadian produced segments. He developed new segments specifically for Sesame Street Canada, which were produced by the CBC with distinctly Canadian themes and set designs. McCarthy also introduced basic French language lessons to the show. He brought in Canadian entertainers and personalities for the show. Sesame Street Canada, which changed its name to Sesame Park in 1996, aired until 2002.

McCarthy died on 10 January 2013, at the Grove Nursing Home in Arnprior, Ontario, at the age of 86.
