= Danny Grossman =

Canadian dancer and choreographer (1942–2023)

- Born: Daniel Grossman; September 13, 1942; San Francisco, California, U.S.
- Died: July 29, 2023 (aged 80); Toronto, Ontario, Canada
- Known for: Dancer; Choreographer
- Movement: Modern/Contemporary dance
- Website: dannygrossman.today

Daniel Grossman (September 13, 1942 – July 29, 2023) was a Canadian dancer, choreographer, and activist. He created the Danny Grossman Dance Company which produced his political dances.

== Early life and dance career ==
Daniel Grossman was born in San Francisco, California on September 13, 1942, to a Polish-Hungarian Jewish father and an Irish Catholic mother. When he was ten he walked his first picket line and remained politically active his whole life.

Grossman began folk dancing in grade school but by 1960 he was learning and performing modern dance with Gloria Unti. In 1963 Paul Taylor saw Grossman at a summer course at Connecticut College and invited him to join his dance company. Grossman performed under the stage name "Danny Williams". Grossman remained with the company for ten years.

== Move to Toronto ==
In 1973 Grossman was invited to Toronto Dance Theatre as a guest artist and remained in Canada ever since. He joined the faculty of York University and choreographed his first piece, a duet called Higher, in 1975, and established the Danny Grossman Dance Company at York soon afterwards.

== Notable works ==
In 1976 Grossman created his first political satire National Spirit, which was about American patriotism. In 1977 he created his first solo Curious Schools of Theatrical Dancing which was about a dancing clown in a circus ring. Also in 1977 he collaborated and danced with Judy Jarvis in Bella, a piece inspired by Giacomo Puccini's music and Marc Chagall's paintings of lovers, with production design by Mary Kerr.

In 1981 Grossman premiered Endangered Species at the New York Space and City Centre. The piece was set in a post-apocalyptic world where the dancers fought against military oppression.

In the 1990s, funding for the arts diminished in Canada and Grossman sought other ways to sustain his company. Grossman wanted to preserve Canadian dance as an art form by remounting works by famous Canadian choreographers like Patricia Beatty, Judy Jarvis, Robert Desrosiers and Peter Randazzo. These revivals were not financially successful and Grossman transitioned the company into an institute for licensing and teaching Grossman's repertoire. Grossman stopped creating new works for the company in 2008.

Grossman was profiled in Moze Mossanen's 1987 documentary film Dance for Modern Times, alongside David Earle, James Kudelka, Ginette Laurin and Christopher House.

== Activism and political work ==
Drawing on his activist upbringing, Grossman was involved with many different organisations to promote dance and the arts. Grossman served on the Toronto Arts Council and participated with Toronto's Artsvote campaign to promote local cultural issues. Grossman also promoted dance education by visiting various public schools and post-secondary institutions to teach classes.

Grossman, who was gay, sometimes choreographing gay-themed dance works.

== Later life and death ==
Grossman suffered from heart problems for several years. These problems contributed to his death in Toronto on July 29, 2023, at the age of 80.

== Awards ==
Grossman received the Jean A. Chalmers Award for Choreography in 1978 and a Dora Mavor Moore Award for Best New Choreography in 1988. In 1998 he received the William Kilbourn Lifetime Achievement Award from the Toronto Arts Awards and the Dance Ontario Award.
