= Donald Himes =

Donald Himes (1930 in Galt, Ontario — January 3, 2011) was a Canadian dancer, choreographer, educator, and composer best known for his work on the children's program Mr. Dressup, whose theme song he wrote.

== Education ==
In 1952, Himes studied Dalcroze eurhythmics at the Royal Conservatory of Music in Toronto, during which time he also taught piano. In 1954, he received a grant from the Canada Council for the Arts to attend the Institut Jaques-Dalcroze in Geneva. He also attended the Martha Graham School "in the mid-1960s".

== Career ==
Himes taught at a variety of institutions throughout Ontario, including the National Ballet School; he also taught at New York State University. His students included David Earle. He worked with Patricia Beatty as an accompanist, and when Beatty, Earle, and Peter Randazzo co-founded Toronto Dance Theatre in 1968, he participated both as a performer and choreographer; as well, he co-composed the music for Toronto Dance Theatre's premiere (a joint venture with Ann Southam), and when the Theatre established a school in 1970, served as its first principal. In 1972, he adapted Jean de Brunhoff's Babar the Elephant stories into a ballet, Babar the Little Elephant, which he choreographed and narrated; the ballet went on tour and was performed in France.

In 1964, Himes joined the cast of Butternut Square on CBC Television, where he portrayed "the Music Man". In this role, he worked with Ernie Coombs and Fred Rogers; when Butternut Square ended in 1967, he followed Coombs to Mr. Dressup, where he not only composed the theme song, but performed it live on air.

Himes retired from Mr. Dressup in 1996, but remained active as a performer, appearing in Holly Small's ballet Souls in 2001, and in David Earle's ballet Court in 2003.

He was a practitioner of the Feldenkrais method of movement therapy.

== Personal life ==
Himes was gay.

In December 2010, he underwent hip replacement surgery, but subsequently died of heart failure.
