= Aiko Suzuki =

Canadian artist (1937–2005)

- Born: Geraldine Aiko Suzuki; October 22, 1937; Vancouver, British Columbia, Canada
- Died: December 31, 2005 (aged 68); Toronto, Ontario, Canada
- Occupations: Textile artist; Visual artist
- Spouse: Alexander Szlavnics (m. 1965, divorced)
- Children: 1
- Relatives: David Suzuki (brother)

Geraldine Aiko Suzuki (October 22, 1937 – December 31, 2005) was a Canadian textile and visual artist. She began her career in art as a painter before becoming a free-form set designer with the Toronto Dance Theatre. Suzuki produced a directory of Japanese-Canadian artists called Japanese Canadians in the Arts in 1994 and co-founded the Gendai Gallery, a non-profit art space at the Japanese Canadian Cultural Centre in Toronto that same year. She was an elected member of the Royal Canadian Academy of Arts.

== Early life ==
Suzuki was born in Vancouver on October 22, 1937, and was of Japanese ancestry. She was the third of four children of Kaoru and Setsu Suzuki, who were residents of Marpole, British Columbia. Suzuki's brother is the geneticist and CBC television personality David Suzuki; all members of her family had English and Japanese names. In 1942, along with other Japanese families, she and her family were interned in a wartime camp in the interior of British Columbia during World War II, before being moved to Leamington and then to London, Ontario in 1945, when the war came to an end. Suzuki moved from London to Toronto in 1958, opting to attend London Artists’ Workshop and later joined the Toronto Artists’ Workshop, soon becoming entwined in the local bohemian art scene.

== Career ==
She began her artistic career as a painter of hard-edged paintings in 1967 and continued until 1972. Suzuki broadened her work as a free-form set designer with the Toronto Dance Theatre in 1969. One such piece was Study. For A Song In The Distance that she hung with three ropes hanging over the stage in December 1969. She had her solo debut with the acrylic on canvas painting Release at the Pollack Gallery in 1967 and included a soundtrack. That same year saw Suzuki exhibit at the Art Gallery of Toronto and used pop subject matter and American and European techniques. In 1969, she designed the sat of David Earle's ballet Thread of Sand at the Toronto Dance Theatre, also working with choreographer Trish Beatty on several productions at the company. Suzuki began creating fibre art in 1972 and completed a commission for the lobby of the Metro Central Reference Library in 1980, having had the marquettes selected by a jury and endorsed by the Metro Library Board. She created Tear Drop in 1976.

Her suspended white fibre waterfall sculpture, Lyra, named after the Greek goddess of the harp, was installed in the foyer of the Toronto Public Library in 1981. Suzuki created the fibre and wood sculpture Amazon Lace in 1982. She designed the set for the National Ballet of Canada's production of Earle's ballet Realm that premiered in May 1985. One of her few non-abstract works was the charcoal diptych, The Package, that she created in 1990. Suzuki was a champion of diverse communities ranging from Japanese-Canadian, Indian and Inuit artists, such as when she coordinated the exhibition Visions of Power: Contemporary Art by First Nations, Inuit and Japanese Canadians in 1991. She produced a directory of Japanese-Canadian artists called Japanese Canadians in the Arts in 1994. In her final work, Bombard/Invade/Radiate that was unveiled in May 2005, Suzuki employed audio, photography and video and turned the camera onto herself to produce a reflection of Susan Sontag's characteristics of dealing with breast cancer that she was suffering from.

Suzuki was a board member of the Japanese Canadian Cultural Centre. In 1994, Suzuki co-founded the Gendai Gallery, a non-profit art space at the Japanese Canadian Cultural Centre in Toronto, and in 2005, she was elected a member of the Royal Canadian Academy of Arts. She mentored several artists through art workshops and film animation workshops for more than 25 years, teaching art at the Upper Canada College and film animation at Harbourfront. Suzuki also worked with the Inner City Angels organization.

== Technique ==
She employed strands of fibre to explore three-dimensional spatial forms of dramatic, emotional impact, and manipulated the individual strands of fibres into her works. Suzuki worked with a wide variety of media, going from monumental textiles, to acrylic, monoprints and oils, and relied on color, mood and texture. Lotta Dempsey of the Toronto Star wrote, "Suzuki's distinct approach is so New Wave she may very well be a pioneer in her field."

== Personal life ==
She married the Hungarian iconoclastic makeup artist Alexander Szlavnics in 1965 but the marriage was dissolved soon after. There was one daughter of the marriage. Suzuki was diagnosed with breast cancer in mid-2002 and was given six months to live. She died at her home in Toronto on December 31, 2005. Suzuki's memorial service took place at the Japanese Canadian Cultural Centre on January 14, 2006.
