= Ginette Laurin =

Canadian choreographer

Ginette Laurin C.M. (born in Montreal 3 January 1955) is a Canadian dancer, choreographer and artistic director. In 1984, she founded the dance group named O Vertigo, based in Montreal. O Vertigo is dedicated to creation in new dance and to broadcasting Ginette Laurin's works all over the world.

== Biography ==
Trained as a gymnast and in modern dance and classical ballet in Montreal and New York City, Ginette Laurin began her dancing career in Montreal at the beginning of the 1970s. After creating several works as a choreographer, she founded O Vertigo, a company known for its expressive power and the unerring realization of its artistic vision. Besides creating works at O Vertigo, Ginette Laurin has choreographs pieces for other dance companies including Les Grands Ballets Canadiens and Introdans in the Netherlands, and for film. She also transmits her knowledge as an instructor at Université du Québec à Montréal (UQAM) and at European festivals, and through workshops held by O Vertigo. With more than 50 choreographical works to her credit and acclaimed worldwide, Ginette Laurin is one of the foremost figures in contemporary dance in Canada.

She was profiled in Moze Mossanen's 1987 documentary film Dance for Modern Times, alongside David Earle, James Kudelka, Christopher House and Danny Grossman.

== Main choreographies ==
- 1979 : Sept fois passera
- 1980 : L'Inceste
- 1987 : Full House
- 1989 : Chagall
- 1992 : La Chambre Blanche (recreated in 2008)
- 1995 : Horizon; 1.60
- 1997 : En Dedans
- 1997 : La Bête
- 1999 : La Vie qui bat (cover version in 2009)
- 2001 : Luna
- 2004 : La Résonance du double
- 2006 : ANGELs
- 2007 : Études #3 pour cordes et poulie de Laurin
- 2010 : Onde de choc
- 2012 : KHAOS
- 2014 : Soif

== Films and videos ==
- 1996: Night of the Flood (La Nuit du déluge)
- 2005 : Wire Frame also known as Point de fuite
- 2009 : la chambre blanche

== Awards ==
- 2015 : Order of Canada
- 2006 : Award for Best Canadian Work at the International Festival of Films on Art (FIFA) for Wire Frame, a television adaptation of the work Passare.
- 2003 : Cinedance Award for Best Direction at the Moving Pictures Festival in Toronto for the short film Passare
- 2002 : Prix reconnaissance UQAM (Université du Québec à Montréal), Arts Faculty for the exceptional manner in which Ginette Laurin has promoted her field of study here and abroad.
- 1993 : Grand Prix du Conseil des arts de la Communauté urbaine de Montréal for the excellence of the production La Chambre Blanche.
- 1986 : Jean A. Chalmers Award to Ginette Laurin for outstanding choreography, given by the Ontario Arts Council.
