= CBC Museum =

Canadian museum in Toronto

Coordinates: 43.644833°N 79.388194°W

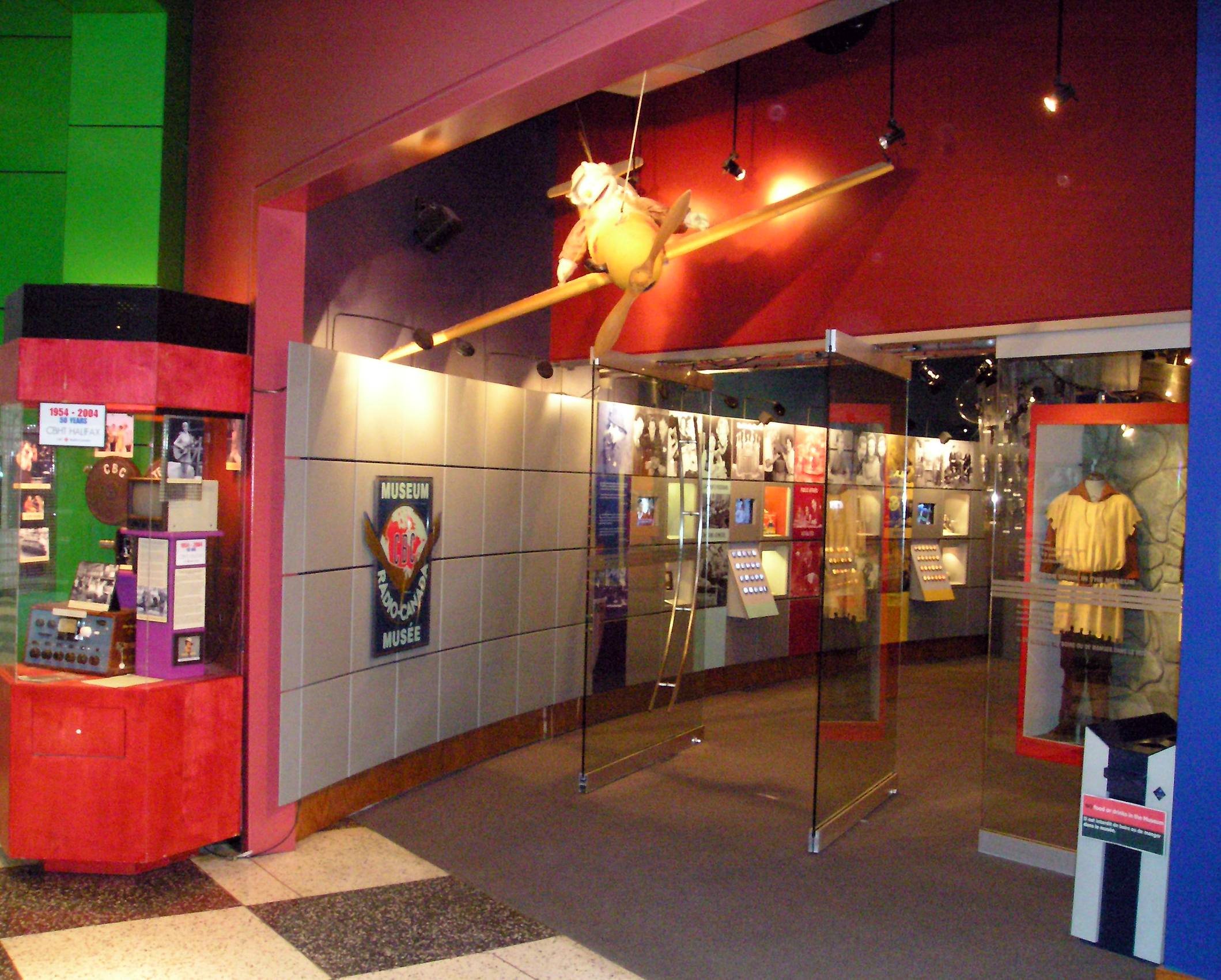
- Established: 1994; 1960 (its collection)
- Dissolved: 22 December 2017
- Location: 250 Front Street West, Toronto, Ontario, Canada
- Owner: Canadian Broadcasting Corporation
- Public transit access: Union Station; Union
- Website: www.cbc.ca/museum/

The CBC Museum was dedicated to the preserving the physical heritage and archival materials relating to the history of the Canadian Broadcasting Corporation (CBC). It was located in the Canadian Broadcasting Centre at 250 Front Street West, Toronto, Ontario, Canada. The museum collection began by at least 1960, the current display space opened in 1994, and closed on December 22, 2017.

The museum featured a number of interactive exhibits where people can call up excerpts from famous CBC television shows, including children's series, news and sport events.

== History ==
=== Early collecting ===
"The men in the promotion department" at CBC assembled a museum collection by at least 1960. In 1961, The Globe and Mail mentioned a museum "at this point stored in an out-of-the-way CBC building." At the time, it included "exhibits which take broadcasting from the crystal-set stage to the transistor radio and portable TV." The majority of items were gathered from collectors. One highlight was a 1000 lbs Blattnerphone steel tape audio recorder, believed by staff to be the only complete model in North America.

Around 100,000 people in Aylmer, Ontario saw an exhibit of some of the artifacts in October 1960.

Jack Brickenden, a CBC publicist, is said to have "dreamed out loud" of establishing a museum, in the early 1970s, but network management was unenthusiastic. Nevertheless, in 1971, employee Ivan Harris is credited for founding the modern museum collection. (Harris also helped establish the Whitchurch-Stouffville Museum and York-Durham Heritage Railway.)

A museum was operated by the CBC in one of its many Toronto building for some duration of time, closing shortly before 1991. The introduction to an article about "exotic" museums in the City of Toronto noted that it was "a victim of federal cutbacks." This display wasn't mentioned in 1994 coverage of the new facility.

=== New facility ===
The 16,000 square foot museum opened as part of the corporation's larger Canadian Broadcasting Centre. Prior to its construction, the CBC was spread out in two dozen buildings in 18 locations in Toronto.

The facility was initially operated by volunteers, including retired CBC employee Ivan Harris, its curator. (Harris maintained a curatorial role as of 2002, when he was presented to Queen Elizabeth II on her visit to the building.)

The initial displays included a mock living room offering clips from 24 1950s CBC television series, a listening station with clips from CBC Radio's first decade, photos of CBC personalities, additional audio stations with Lorne Greene, Barbara Frum, and Foster Hewitt, and screens offering clips of television series from the 1960s through 1980s. Physical artifacts included broadcasting equipment, as well as outfits worn by Juliette, Tommy Hunter, Bob Homme, and Cross-Canada Hit Parade.

The CBC sent a VIA train on a nationwide tour for their 50th anniversary in 2002, complete with artifacts on loan from the CBC Museum.

=== Staff redundancy, controversy ===
Museum curator Faye Blum and another employee were deemed "redundant" in 2007, leaving that October. Blum assumed that the museum would be closing, and met with Richard Stursberg, head of CBC's English service. As the Canada Science and Technology Museum agreed to take the collection, and Blum asked for an extension to make sure the items were catalogued for their transfer. Stursberg denied the request, but assured Blum he'd oversee the process.

Concerned, Blum contacted those loaning artifacts, offering their return. The family of The Friendly Giant actor Bob Homme agreed to let the museum continue its loan of Rusty and Jerome, puppets from the series.

Later in October 2007, the CBC aired the 2007 Gemini Awards, which included a segment about a retirement home for children's television characters. Rusty and Jerome were used without the family's permission, contrary to their terms of loan. Other characters in the comedy segment, about a retirement home for children's television characters, were other puppets were depicted having oral sex, smoking, and drinking.

The family contacted the CBC on November 2, and it was said that the employee newly responsible for the museum was unaware of loan agreements. A month after the segment aired, Richard and Ann Homme, children of the late Bob Homme, retrieved the puppets from the museum. A CBC spokesperson offer a non-apology apology, in part saying that they "regret that they feel any trust was breached." They hinted at exhibiting them at an unspecified location. The castle wall and window that Friendly would lean over to talk to Jerome and Rusty, however, remained in the museum.

=== Closure ===
In 2017, in the wake of the Gemini Awards segment, the CBC noted on-going plans to redevelop the main floor of the Canadian Broadcasting Centre. They intended to "include displays, artifacts and information that will represent CBC's rich history, its programs and its people."

Toronto Star columnist Shawn Micallef noticed that "for years" before the closure, there were displays "falling apart" and broken monitors. The museum was named by the Toronto Star in 2011 as one of the "museums you never knew existed."

Little advanced warning was given of the closure, announced in an internal email to staff.

== Exhibits ==
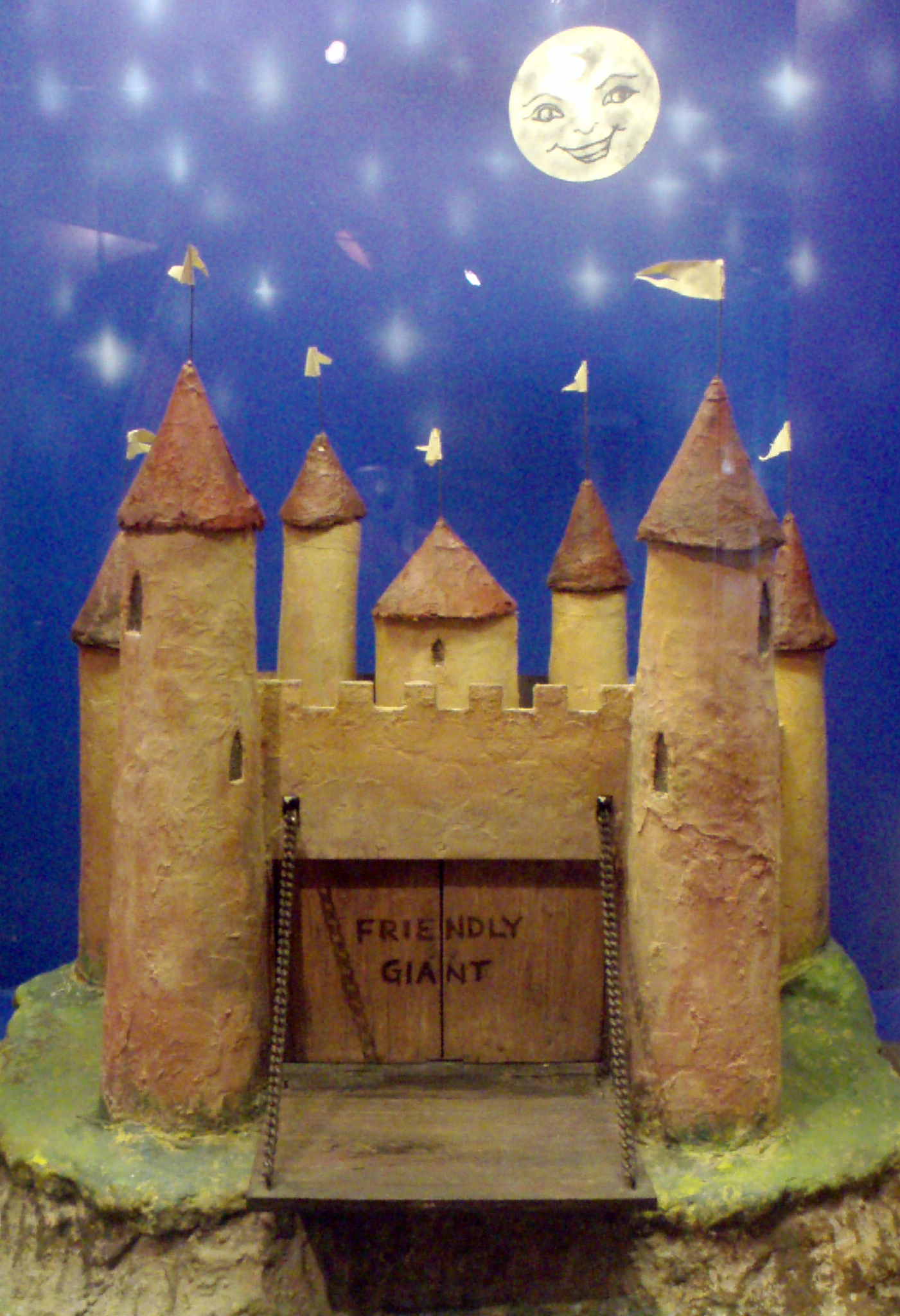
CBC Museum Collection

- CBC War Effort was an interactive exhibit running from at least February to December 15, 1996, timed to coincide with larger plans for the network's 60th anniversary. The exhibit looked at the creation of their overseas unit, their news service, and programming on the homefront.
- Show & Tell: Growing Up Canadian (started January 27, 1999 to at least September 30, 2000) included artifacts from Chez Hélène, The Friendly Giant, Maggie Muggins, Mr. Dressup, and Razzle Dazzle. A "Club House" allowed children to try puppetry on camera. The exhibit included workshops, storytelling and crafts the last Saturday of every month. The exhibit included Rusty and Jerome from The Friendly Giant.
- A Canadian Document (ca. July to September 3, 2001) Photography from Richard Harrington, Rosemary Gilliat, Wolf Koenig, and Yousuf Karsh.
- Ballet From Stage to Screen (January 28 or earlier to February 28, 2003) was an exhibit about the "art of televising ballet".
- Growing Up with CBC (ca. 2003–2017): props, puppets, photos, and video clips from two CBC children's shows Mr. Dressup, Sesame Park, The Friendly Giant, and the Neighborhood Trolley from the CBC version of Mister Rogers' Neighborhood. The display of Sesame Park puppets included Basil, Louis, Dodi, Katie, and Chaos.
- CBC Radio Sound Effects (ca. 2003–2017): displays many of the objects and equipment used by the sound effects department at the CBC for many years. (Harris was hired to the CBC in 1960 as a special effects artist.)

In addition, the museum has an interactive video area where clips from various documentary and news programs over the years can be viewed, as can exhibits of vintage recording equipment, cameras and microphones.

The exhibits extend beyond the museum, with Casey and Finnegan's treehouse from Mr. Dressup located across from the entrance, and additional exhibits of memorabilia and photographs in display cases around the CBC lobby.

An exhibit in the museum offered visitors to cue up news clips, circa 2002.

=== Outside the main gallery ===
The Ivan Harris Gallery was located on the lower level of the building, down a set of elevators, en route to the PATH. The space included a window into visible storage, multiple display cases, and a variety of artifacts behind stanchions. A display case of awards received by the broadcaster was located behind a set of stairs.

An exhibit about radio show The Happy Gang, including "fan letters, scrapbooks, photos and more" began in 2005.

The space was updated in 2006 by Perna Siegrist Design.

The treehouse from Mr. Dressup was added in the building lobby.

== Adjacent theatre ==
Adjacent to the museum is the Graham Spry Theatre, a 40-seat venue projects video onto a screen made to look like a giant version of a 1950s era wooden television set. It displayed a loop of selected CBC television shows. (When the space opened, it offered bench seating for 32 people.)

Shows generally rotated on a monthly basis. On opening, the area featured an eight-minute rotation of clips of ballets and musicals staged by Norman Campbell. As of 2001, selections were from the 1940s to 1960s.

Selections included episodes from such series as Peppiatt & Aylesworth, The Tommy Hunter Show, The Frantics, 4 on the Floor, and The Kids in the Hall.

Plans for a pay-per-view station of old programs at the CBC Archives in spring 1995 are not believed to have materialized.

== Public access ==
The museum was open weekdays from 9 am to 5 pm. It was closed on statutory holidays. The facility was wheelchair accessible.

On opening in 1994, the facility was open daily from 10 am to 3 pm, with guided tours at opening and 2:30 pm, and daily availability for school tours. As of 1996, the museum was open weekdays from 10 am to 4 pm. By 2001 or earlier, hours changed to weekdays, 9 am to 5 pm, Saturdays, noon to 4 pm. Saturdays continued until at least 2003.

The museum was free, but as of 2011 had a donation box.

== Affiliations ==
The Museum is affiliated with: Canadian Museums Association, Canadian Heritage Information Network, and Virtual Museum of Canada.

Since at least 1996, large equipment has been sent to the Canada Science and Technology Museum in Ottawa.
