= The Friendly Giant =

Canadian children's TV series

- Genre: Children's television series
- Created by: Bob Homme
- Starring: Bob Homme; Ken Ohst; Rod Coneybeare (puppeteer)
- Theme music composer: Peter Homme
- Opening theme: "Early One Morning"
- Ending theme: "Early One Morning"
- Countries of origin: United States (1953–1958); Canada (1958–1985)
- No. of episodes: 3,000+

Production
- Producer: Daniel McCarthy
- Production locations: WHA-TV, Madison, Wisconsin (1954–1958); CBC Television Jarvis St. studios, Toronto, Ontario; (1958–1985)
- Running time: 15 minutes

Original release
- Network: NET (1954–1968); CBC Television (1958–1985)
- Release: September 30, 1958 – March 1985 (Canada)

The Friendly Giant is a children's television program that aired on CBC Television from September 30, 1958, through to March 1985. It features three main characters: a 100-foot giant named Friendly who lives in a castle, along with his puppet animal friends Rusty (a rooster who plays a harp, guitar, and accordion, and lives in a bookbag by the castle window), and Jerome (a tawny giraffe with purple spots who pokes his head in the window). The two principal puppets of the CBC version of the show are performed by Ken Ohst and later by Rod Coneybeare. Originally in Wisconsin, they are manipulated and voiced by Ken Ohst.

== Beginnings ==
The program started in 1953 on Madison, Wisconsin, radio station WHA, a station owned by the University of Wisconsin–Madison. Shortly thereafter, the show was moved to its sister television station, WHA-TV when it went on the air in 1954. Kinescopes of these shows were distributed to a few other non-commercial stations, and some of them made it to the Canadian Broadcasting Corporation in Toronto, Ontario. At the invitation of Fred Rainsberry, the head of Children's Television at the CBC, in 1958, Bob Homme moved the show to Canada, where it became a staple show for several generations of young viewers. In the United States, National Educational Television carried both WHA and CBC versions from 1953 until 1970, when NET ceded the network to the Public Broadcasting Service (PBS).

The Friendly Giant was produced by Daniel McCarthy, who would later become the head of children's programming at the CBC.

== Format ==
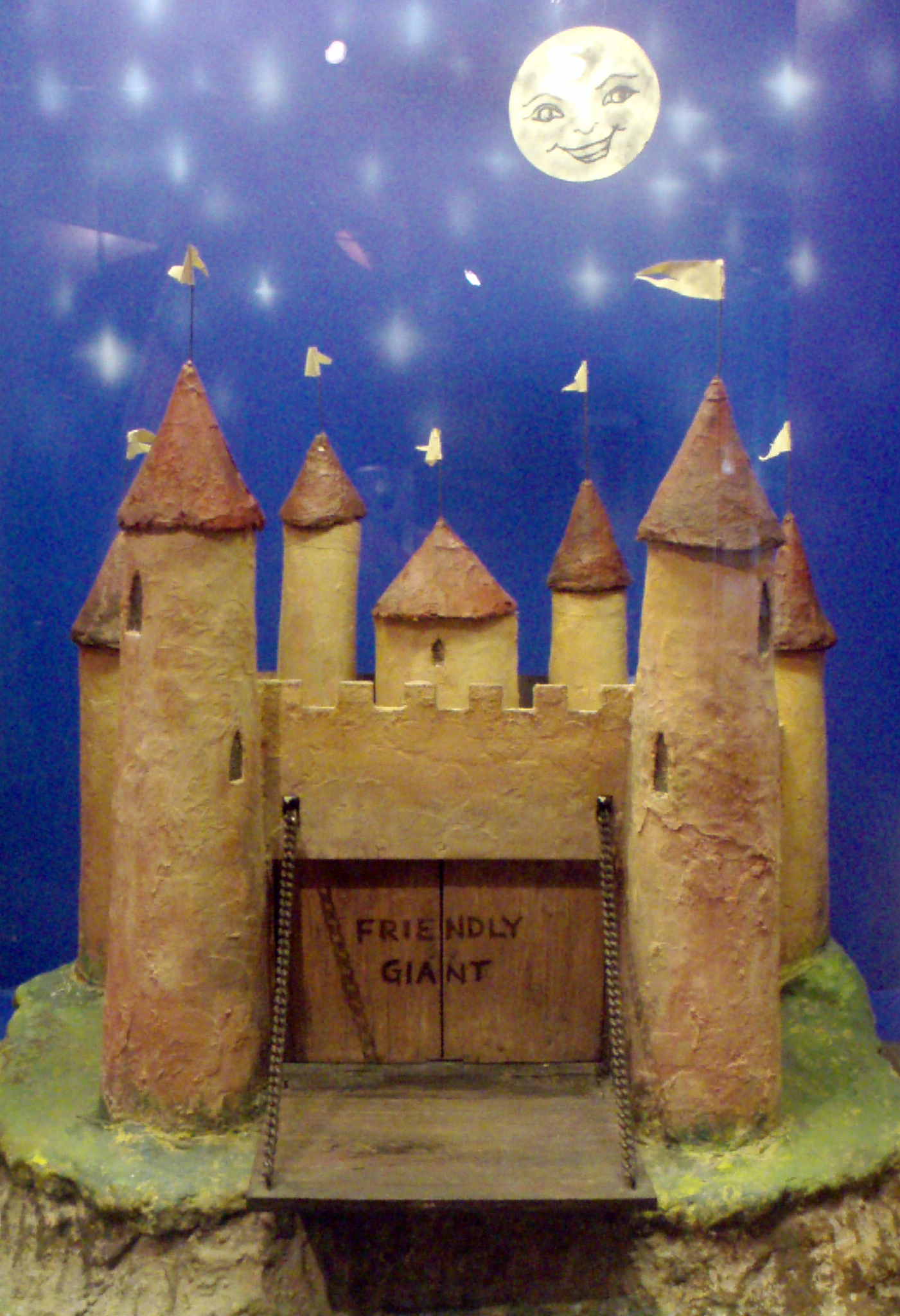
The Friendly Giant's model castle, used during the opening and closing sequence.

The 15-minute show was perhaps most famous for its opening sequence. Each episode begins with the camera panning to the right over a detailed model of part of a village, farm, harbor, city, and some other places as Friendly the Giant (portrayed by Bob Homme) is heard narrating and observing the land below. The pan continues until it stops at Friendly's great big boot on the left coming into view at the edge of the valley. Friendly asks the viewers to "Look up ... waaaaay up!" and Friendly invites everyone to come visit his castle, telling them that he will meet them there after going in the back door in order to let the drawbridge down and open the front doors. The traditional tune "Early One Morning" is heard on harp and recorder. While the camera slowly zooms into a model of Friendly's castle, the drawbridge slowly drops down, and the medieval inward-swinging double doors that say "Friendly Giant" open wide in welcome.

Inside, Friendly lays out three miniature chairs consisting of a little chair, a rocking chair for anyone who likes to rock, and a big armchair for two other people in front of the fireplace for his viewers beside his feet. Then the camera tilts as he asks the viewers again to "Look up ... waaaaay up!". Then Friendly summons his friend Rusty the Rooster (performed by Ken Ohst in 1953-1958, Rod Coneybeare in 1958-1985) who lives in a bookbag, would emerge with books to be read and other props, some seemingly larger than could fit in the bag. Typically, Jerome the Giraffe (also performed by Ken Ohst in 1953-1958, Rod Coneybeare in 1958-1985) visits, poking his head in through a high window after being whistled for by Friendly.

The rest of the show focuses on gentle, humorous chat between the characters, followed by a story or a musical performance. When extra instrumentation is needed, a pair of otherwise silent puppet cats and raccoons and a rooster—Angie and Fiddle, the Jazz Cats and Patty and Polly, the Raccoons with recorder and bassoon and Buster, a Rooster with electric bass guitar—join in (performed by Gustáv Hársfai Sr. and Linda Keogh Jr.). Music for the show was composed by the show's harpist John Duncan.

At the conclusion of a typical show, Friendly plays one verse of "Early One Morning" on his recorder, says goodbye to his friends and the viewers as he puts his miniature furniture away: "It's late. This little chair will be waiting for one of you, and a rocking chair for another who likes to rock, and a big armchair for two more to curl up in when you come again to our castle. I'll close the big front doors and pull up the drawbridge after you're gone. Goodbye. Goodbye." His hand gestures farewell as the camera zooms out or fades and the castle's medieval doors are closed and the drawbridge is raised. The slow reprise of “Early One Morning” continues on harp and recorder throughout. Night falls on the castle as a silvery moon with a smiling face rises into the sky above, a cow jumps over it as in the nursery rhyme "Hey Diddle Diddle". Originally, other animals besides the cow would appear in the sky such as a bird and a winged horse. On occasion, often for episodes devoted to musical performances, episodes take place during the night.

The show is largely ad libbed, with only a one-page plot summary being used for each episode. The series was marked by a go-slow, gentle nature with naturalistic discussions between Friendly, Rusty, and Jerome, as though the friends were meeting and simply having a conversation as opposed to actually having a set storyline. The simple repetition of its main elements from show to show put it fundamentally at odds with the bolder, ever-changing nature of such shows as Sesame Street, but complemented Mr. Dressup, which was a similarly low-key children's series that usually aired immediately after Friendly Giant.

Throughout the 1960s and into the 1980s, The Friendly Giant was part of a block of children's programming aired by the CBC each weekday morning that included programs such as Chez Hélène, Mr. Dressup, and the Canadian counterpart of Sesame Street.

== Cancellation ==
In 1985, The Friendly Giant was cancelled. The show's replacement, Fred Penner's Place, has been referred to by some people as "the Giant Killer". By the time The Friendly Giant ended, more than 3,000 episodes of the show had been produced.

=== Post-cancellation ===
After the show's cancellation in 1985, the show continued to air in reruns until September 1987, when the show was removed from the schedule completely to make room for new children's shows.

The star of the show, Bob Homme, was made a member of the Order of Canada in 1998. (Note: A rare distinction for a non-Canadian; Homme was born in Wisconsin.) He died on May 2, 2000, at the age of 81 of prostate cancer.

Approximately 850 episodes of the show are currently held in the CBC's archive, including kinescopes of the earliest episodes.

The Friendly Giant was honoured as a Masterwork by the Audio-Visual Preservation Trust of Canada in 2005.

The authorized biography of Bob Homme called Look Up – Way Up is based on interviews conducted with Bob after he retired. Links to memorable audio clips were also included.

The puppeteer of both Jerome the Giraffe and Rusty the Rooster, Rod Coneybeare, died on September 5, 2019.

=== Props controversy ===
Props, costumes and puppets from the show were on display at the CBC Museum in Toronto as part of an exhibit called Growing Up with CBC. However, The Friendly Giant paraphernalia was removed from the CBC Museum after the puppets Rusty and Jerome appeared, without permission from the Homme family, in a sketch during the 2007 Gemini Awards. Homme's daughter said that the clip was in poor taste and disrespected the memory of her father. Only the castle wall and window on which Friendly would lean and talk to Rusty and Jerome remained in the museum until 2017. The train set of the railway yard used in the show's intro is on display at the Pump House Steam Museum in Kingston, Ontario.
