= Ernie Coombs =

Canadian children's entertainer (1927–2001)

Ernie Coombs CM
- Born: Ernest Arthur Coombs; November 26, 1927; Lewiston, Maine, U.S.
- Died: September 18, 2001 (aged 73); Pickering, Ontario, Canada
- Resting place: Chamberlain Cemetery, Round Pond, Lincoln County, Maine, US
- Occupation: Entertainer
- Spouse: Marlene Coombs
- Children: 2

Ernest Arthur Coombs, CM (November 26, 1927 – September 18, 2001) was an American-Canadian children's entertainer who starred in the Canadian television series Mr. Dressup (1967–1996).

His career began as an assistant puppeteer to Fred Rogers, joining him in Canada when his employer was invited to produce a variant of his local Pittsburgh show for CBC Television, The Children's Corner on a national series, Mister Rogers. When Rogers decided to return to the United States, Coombs chose to stay in Canada on his employer's recommendation, developing the children's show Butternut Square, which later evolved into Mr. Dressup, which went on to become a long-running and iconic presence in Canadian media. He eventually became a Canadian citizen and became an honouree of the Order of Canada, among other honours.

== Television performances ==
Ernest Coombs was born in Lewiston, Maine, and pursued a career in children's entertainment after attending North Yarmouth Academy in Yarmouth, Maine. He was assistant puppeteer to Fred Rogers, working with him at WQED in Pittsburgh on Rogers's noontime program, The Children's Corner. Rogers and Coombs became close friends and when Rogers was offered a show in 1962 at the Canadian Broadcasting Corporation, he invited Coombs to join him in Canada to work on an early version of Mister Rogers' Neighborhood, called Misterogers. Rogers moved back to the United States three years later, but Coombs decided to stay in Canada upon his employer's recommendation to the network, joining a new TV series called Butternut Square. Butternut Square ran from 1964 to 1967. During the run, Coombs appeared as the character in the Poor Alex Theatre in The Tickle Trunk, starring Mr. Dressup with Casey and Finnegan.

After Butternut Square ended, Coombs developed Mr. Dressup, which became one of English Canada's longest-running and most beloved children's programs. As Mr. Dressup, he presented arts and crafts, songs, stories and games for children with his friends Casey and Finnegan, a child and a dog who lived in a treehouse in Mr. Dressup's back yard. Casey was given a unisex name intentionally, because the character's childlike voice left Casey's sex ambiguous. Over the years, when viewers would ask Coombs whether Casey was a boy or a girl, he would ask, "What do you think?" However the questioner responded, he would say, "You're right!"

Later in the series, when the show's principal puppeteer, Judith Lawrence, retired, Casey and Finnegan were replaced by a small cast of anthropomorphic animal puppets. Coombs believed in gentle, wholesome children's programming that encouraged kids to use their creativity and imagination. In each episode, Mr. Dressup would dress up in a costume from his Tickle Trunk, and lead children in an imagination game. Many times his puppets would appear in costume as well.

The series continued production until its final taping in February 1996, when Coombs retired, though he returned for the 2 1/2-hour-long Mr. Dressup's Holiday Special in 1997. Reruns continued to be shown on CBC Television until they were discontinued on September 3, 2006.

After retirement, Coombs continued to work as an entertainer, playing roles in Ross Petty's Christmas pantomimes of Peter Pan, Cinderella, and Aladdin; narrated a 2002 Canadian revival of the British animated television series, Simon in the Land of Chalk Drawings; and acted as a spokesman for children's charities.

Coombs also did a travelling stage show called Tales from the Tickle Trunk, in which he shared stories about the making of Mr. Dressup, as well as the origins, and fates, of some of the characters.

== Personal life ==
Coombs lived with his family in the city of Pickering, Ontario. His wife Marlene (known as Lynn) ran a day care at the former SS#3 schoolhouse on Finch Avenue East west of Neilson Road in Scarborough (east Toronto), called the Butternut Learning Centre (now Whitefield Christian Academy). They had two children: Catherine and Christopher. Marlene was killed in a traffic accident in 1992; she was walking on the sidewalk of Yonge Street in Toronto, when a car hit her. The driver may have had a seizure, resulting in a loss of control of the vehicle.

Coombs became a Canadian citizen in 1994. In 1996, he was named a Member of the Order of Canada.

== Death ==
Coombs suffered a stroke on September 10, 2001, and died eight days later on September 18, 2001, at the age of 73.

== Awards ==
- 1989: Lifetime Achievement Award from the Children's Broadcast Institute
- 1994: The Academy of Canadian and Television's prestigious Earle Grey Award, for excellence in Canadian television programming
- 1996: Appointed as a Member of the Order of Canada
- 1996: Gemini for best performance in a children's program
- 1997: Save the Children Award, for his many years of service as spokesperson for the Canadian Save the Children Foundation.
- 2001: Honorary doctorate of laws by Trent University in Peterborough, Ontario
- 2007: Inducted into the Town of Milton's Walk of Fame
- 2019: Awarded a star on Canada's Walk of Fame

== Tributes ==
Google's commemorative doodle of their logo used on November 26, 2012

A tribute was made to Coombs in the Canadian television show The Latest Buzz, where the school for which the show is set is named Ernie Coombs High.

On November 26, 2012, Google commemorated Coombs' 85th birthday with a Google Doodle.

Chris Whiteley wrote and recorded a song entitled "The Week That Ernie Died" as a tribute to Coombs.

In 2022, a Mr. Dressup documentary, to be directed by Robert McCallum, was announced by Amazon Prime Video. The documentary, Mr. Dressup: The Magic of Make-Believe, premiered at the 2023 Toronto International Film Festival, where it won the People's Choice Award for Documentaries.
