= Early One Morning =

Folk song

"Early One Morning" (Roud V9617) is an English folk song with lyrics first found in publications as far back as 1787. A broadside ballad sheet in the Bodleian Library, Oxford, dated between 1828 and 1829 has the title "The Lamenting Maid" and refers to the lover leaving to become a sailor.

The now well-known melody was first printed by William Chappell in his publication National English Airs c.1855-1859. The melody may be derived from an earlier song "The Forsaken Lover". Chappell wrote in his later Popular Music of the Olden Time:

If I were required to name three of the most popular songs among the servant-maids of the present generation, I should say, from my own experience, that they are Cupid's Garden, I sow'd the seeds of love, and Early one morning. I have heard Early one morning sung by servants who came from Leeds, from Hereford and from Devonshire, and by others from parts nearer to London. The tune... was, I believe first printed in my collection.... from one of the penny song-books collected by Ritson, and it is curious that scarcely any two copies agree beyond the second line, although the subject is always the same - a damsel's complaint for the loss of her lover.

This tune was also used as the opening and closing theme to the beloved Canadian children's short programme, The Friendly Giant (1958-1985).

== Lyrics ==
Early One Morning
Tune for Early One Morning

Early one morning,
Just as the sun was rising,
I heard a young maid sing,
In the valley below.

CHORUS:
Oh, don't deceive me,
Oh, never leave me,
How could you use
A poor maiden so?

Remember the vows,
That you made to your Mary,
Remember the bow'r,
Where you vowed to be true,

Chorus

Oh Gay is the garland,
And fresh are the roses,
I've culled from the garden,
To place upon thy brow.

Chorus

Thus sang the poor maiden,
Her sorrows bewailing,
Thus sang the poor maid,
In the valley below.

Chorus

- Another version:

Early one morning
just as the sun was rising,
I heard a young maid sing
in the valley below.

Oh, don't deceive me,
Oh, never leave me,
How could you use
A poor maiden so?

Remember the vows that
you made to me truly,
Remember how tenderly
you nestled close to me.

Gay is the garland
fresh are the roses
I've culled from the garden
to bind over thee.

Here I now wander
alone as I wonder
Why did you leave me
to sigh and complain.

I ask of the roses
why should I be forsaken,
Why must I here in sorrow remain?

Through yonder grove by the spring that is running,
There you and I have so merrily played,
Kissing and courting and gently sporting,
Oh, my innocent heart you've betrayed.

Soon you will meet with another pretty maiden,
Some pretty maiden,
you'll court her for a while.

Thus ever ranging
turning and changing,
Always seeking for a girl that is new.

Thus sung the maiden,
her sorrows bewailing
Thus sung the maid
in the valley below

Oh, don't deceive me,
Oh, never leave me,
How could you use
A poor maiden so?

== Arrangements ==
The folk song is used in a number of well known folk-song arrangements, for example by the English composers Benjamin Britten and Gordon Jacob along with the Australian composer Percy Aldridge Grainger. Its melody forms the opening bars of the "Radio 4 UK Theme" by Fritz Spiegl, which was played every morning at the switch-on of BBC Radio 4 from late 1978 until April 2006. The melody was also adapted by Sir Francis Vivian Dunn as a military slow march called "The Globe and Laurel", created for the Band of the Royal Marines in 1935. The melody is one of the main themes of the "Nell Gwyn Overture" by Edward German. The eponymous poem for piano and orchestra (1930-1, revised 1962) by Cyril Scott is based on the melody and was first recorded by John Ogdon with the London Philharmonic Orchestra and Bernard Herrmann.

The melody was used for many years as the opening theme music for the Canadian Broadcasting Corporation children's TV series, The Friendly Giant, and was performed by star Bob Homme on recorder at the end of every episode.

== In popular culture ==
In the 1971 Bewitched season eight premiere, "How Not to Lose Your Head to King Henry VIII (Part 1)", Samantha Stephens, portrayed by Elizabeth Montgomery, performs the song before Henry VIII.

In Monty Python and the Holy Grail (1975), "Early One Morning" is played in the background as the tale of Sir Lancelot begins.

Hayley Mills (as Pollyanna) and Nancy Olson (as Nancy Furman) sing the song in the Disney film Pollyanna (1960).

"Early One Morning" is used as a plot device in Buffy the Vampire Slayer Season 7, Episode 8, "Sleeper," where the First Evil uses the song as a trigger to turn re-ensouled Spike back into a killer.

In The Knife Of Never Letting Go by Patrick Ness, the song is used as a connection between the protagonist, Todd, and his deceased mother.

== Recordings ==
- Sarah Brightman, on The Trees They Grow So High.
- Eva Cassidy, on Somewhere.
- Hayley Mills and Nancy Olson sang the song in the 1960 Disney film Pollyanna.
- Jim Moray sang the song in his album Sweet England.
- Nana Mouskouri on Quand tu chantes.
- The Tornados recorded an instrumental rock version under the name "Blackpool Rock"
