= Christopher House =

Canadian choreographer (born 1955)

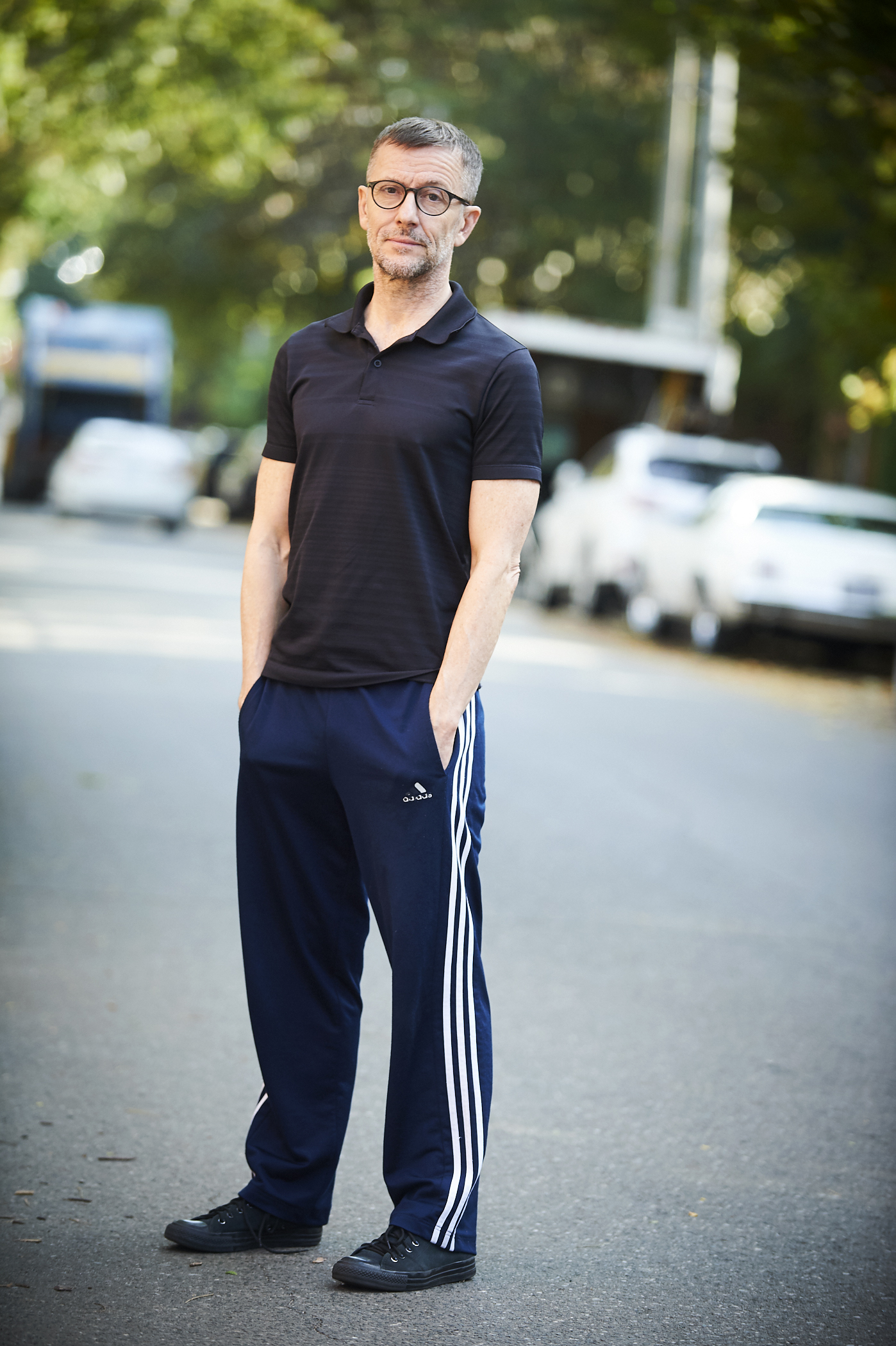
- Born: May 30, 1955 (age 71)
- Occupations: choreographer, performer
- Writing career
- Notable works: Glass Houses, Early Departures, Vena Cava, Nest, Martingales

Christopher House (born May 30, 1955) is a Canadian choreographer, performer and educator. For many years he was the artistic director of Toronto Dance Theatre.

== Early life and education ==
House was born in St.John's, Newfoundland. He moved to Ottawa at the age of 19 where he completed a Bachelor's degree in Political Science at the University of Ottawa. House began his dance training in 1975 with the acclaimed dance educator Elizabeth Langley. House later earned a Bachelor of Fine Arts degree in dance from York University in Toronto.

== Career ==
House joined the Toronto Dance Theatre (TDT) in 1979. In 1981, he was appointed that company's choreographer-in-residence. He remained in that post until 1994 when he was hired as the artistic director at the TDT, a position he held until 2020. House is credited with reshaping the company's image to unprecedented international acclaim with new approaches to choreographic creation and cross-disciplinary collaboration. Since 2006 House has been influenced by his close collaboration with American post-modern dance pioneer Deborah Hay on works such as News and I'll Crane for You. He has also choreographed works for Les Grands Ballets Canadiens, Ballet BC, and the National Ballet of Canada, among many others. In 1989, New York Times dance critic Anna Kisselgoff called House "a fresh voice in modern dance."

In 2007, a documentary of House's life and works, Ahead of the Curve, was co-produced by Rock Island Productions and Rink Rat Productions. He was also profiled in Moze Mossanen's 1987 documentary film Dance for Modern Times, alongside David Earle, James Kudelka, Ginette Laurin and Danny Grossman. In 2019, House was the subject of an episode of the CBC television art series In the Making. The show focused on Marienbad, a full-length work he created and performed with writer Jordan Tannahill.

In 2017, House was appointed to the Order of Canada.

Christopher House left his longtime position at Toronto Dance Theatre in 2020. His final program as artistic director was House Mix, a series of remounted works from House’s choreographic oeuvre that toured 14 cities across Canada and to Medellin and Bogota before making its final performances in Toronto.

In 2022, House debuted New Tricks, a solo work that he performs. The work has toured nationally and is being remounted by Citadel Live in Toronto in 2025.

== Teaching ==
Christopher House has taught technique, repertoire and creative process at The School of Toronto Dance Theatre, Juilliard School, Rotterdam Dansacademie, Jacob's Pillow, Ryerson University (now Toronto Metropolitan University), Simon Fraser University and Canada's National Ballet School and the Banff Centre for the Arts. He taught Creative Practice for Contemporary Dance Online at the Banff Centre in 2020 and 2021, and Composition at the Dance Arts Institute in 2022-24.

== Awards ==
- Dance Collection Danse Hall of Fame (2024)
- York University Outstanding Achievement Alumni Award (2021)
- Member of the Order of Canada (2017)
- Silver Ticket Award (2012)
- Honorary Doctorate, Memorial University of Newfoundland (2010)
- Muriel Sherrin Award for International Achievement in Dance (2009)
- Dora Mavor Moore Award (1986, 1988, 2007)
- Clifford E. Lee Award (1986)
- Jean A. Chalmers Award (1983)
