= The Bananas (TV series) =

Canadian children's television series

- Genre: Children's television
- Created by: Rod Coneybeare
- Starring: Bonnie-Carol Case; John Davies; Melody Greer; Francois-Regis Klanfer
- Announcer: Alan Maitland
- Theme music composer: Rod Coneybeare; Jim Pirie
- Country of origin: Canada
- Original language: English
- No. of seasons: 1

Production
- Producer: Robert Gibbons
- Running time: 30 minutes

Original release
- Network: CBC Television
- Release: 2 January – 6 February 1969

The Bananas is a Canadian children's television series that aired on CBC Television in 1969.

== Premise ==
The Bananas (Bonnie-Carol Case, John Davies, Melody Greer, Francois-Regis Klanfer) are joined in Bananaland by The Blob (a special-effects pet), the Official, Certified, Genuine, Grade-A Gorilla and The Big Mouth (which provided factoids when fed). Alan Maitland was the Great Announcer.

The show's intent was to promote "attitudes through humour" using comedic sketches. The CBC's schools and youth department produced the series for a target audience between ages nine and 14.

== Scheduling ==
This half-hour series was broadcast on Thursdays at 4:30 p.m. (Eastern time) from 2 January to 6 February 1969.
