= Dance for Modern Times =

- Directed by: Moze Mossanen
- Produced by: Moze Mossanen
- Starring: Christopher House; David Earle; James Kudelka; Ginette Laurin; Danny Grossman
- Cinematography: Norman C. Allin
- Edited by: Boyd Bonitzke
- Music by: Lawrence Shragge
- Production company: Canadian Broadcasting Corporation
- Release date: November 27, 1987 (Bloor Cinema)
- Running time: 84 minutes
- Country: Canada
- Language: English

Dance for Modern Times is a Canadian documentary film, directed by Moze Mossanen and released in 1987. The film depicts contemporary dance through profiles of the work of choreographers Christopher House, David Earle, James Kudelka, Ginette Laurin and Danny Grossman. The film had originally been pitched to TVOntario and the Canadian Broadcasting Corporation as a six-part television series, with the CBC ultimately commissioning it as a documentary film.

The film premiered at the Bloor Cinema in Toronto on November 27, 1987, and had a limited theatrical run in other markets before being broadcast by CBC Television in March 1988. Television critics criticized the CBC for running the film on a Sunday afternoon, calling it an excellent film that deserved a much bigger audience than it was likely to garner in that time slot.

The film received a Genie Award nomination for Best Feature Length Documentary at the 9th Genie Awards in 1988.
