= Mr. Dressup: The Magic of Make-Believe =

2023 Canadian documentary film by Robert McCallum

- Poster
- Directed by: Robert McCallum
- Written by: Robert McCallum; Jordan Christopher Morris
- Produced by: Mark Bishop; Aeschylus Poulos
- Starring: Ernie Coombs
- Cinematography: John Minh Tran
- Edited by: Nathan Shields; David New
- Music by: John H. McCarthy
- Production companies: Amazon MGM Studios marblemedia Pyre Productions; Hawkeye Pictures
- Distributed by: Amazon Prime Video
- Release date: September 9, 2023 (TIFF)
- Running time: 90 minutes
- Country: Canada
- Language: English

Mr. Dressup: The Magic of Make-Believe is a 2023 Canadian documentary film, directed by Robert McCallum. The film profiles Ernie Coombs, the children's entertainer who created and starred in the long-running Canadian television series Mr. Dressup, documenting his career and its impact on Canadian culture and entertainment.

The film premiered at the 2023 Toronto International Film Festival, where it won the People's Choice Award for Documentaries. It was also screened at the 2023 Cinéfest Sudbury International Film Festival, the 2023 Atlantic International Film Festival, and the 2023 Vancouver International Film Festival, and was released to Amazon Prime Video on October 10, 2023. It is the first documentary film to be released through Amazon MGM Studios, a new distributor formed by Amazon Studios following their acquisition of Metro-Goldwyn-Mayer in 2022.

== Critical response ==
On the review aggregator website Rotten Tomatoes, 89% of 9 critics' reviews are positive, with an average rating of 8.4/10.

Rachel Ho of Exclaim! write that "one of the highlights of the film is the focus on Judith Lawrence, the puppeteer responsible for bringing Mr. Dressup's dependable pals, Casey and Finnegan, to life. Lawrence's contributions to Mr. Dressup have long gone unacknowledged (not for lack of trying on Coombs's part), making her inclusion in the film incredibly valuable as she finally gives voice to her experiences on the show." She concluded that "Millions of us watched Mr. Dressup as children, and I'd reckon the majority of us never truly appreciated what he meant to us during those impressionable years — I sure didn't. The Magic of Make-Believe not only serves as a reminder of the joy Coombs brought to our young lives, but it also emphasizes the need for Mr. Dressup's patience and kindness today more than ever."

Victor Stiff of That Shelf also had praise for the film's inclusion of Lawrence, and concluded that "McCallum just delivered the feel-good film I didn’t realize I needed in my life. Mr. Dressup: The Magic of Make-Believe is a charming, insightful, and heartwarming doc about a gentle spirit who dedicated his life to filling the world with joy."

== Awards ==
Award / Film Festival	Date of ceremony	Category	Recipient(s)	Result	Ref(s)
Toronto International Film Festival	September 17, 2023	People's Choice Award for Documentaries	Robert McCallum	Won	
Cinéfest Sudbury International Film Festival	September 28, 2023	Audience Choice for Best Documentary Film	Robert McCallum	Won	
Canadian Screen Awards	2024	Best Direction in a Documentary Program	Robert McCallum	Won	
Canadian Screen Awards	2024	Best Writing in a Documentary Program or Series	Robert McCallum	Won	
Canadian Screen Awards	2024	Barbara Sears Award for Best Editorial Research	Max Berger, Liz Hysen, Catherine Machado, Judy Ruzylo	Won	
Canadian Screen Awards	2024	Barbara Sears Award for Best Visual Research	Max Berger, Liz Hysen, Catherine Machado, Judy Ruzylo	Won	
Canadian Screen Awards	2024	Best Production Design or Art Direction, Non-Fiction	Rudin Causi, Javed Ali	Won	
