= Royal Suite (TV series) =

Canadian television series

- Genre: Comedy drama
- Written by: Rod Coneybeare; Charles Israel; George Salverson
- Directed by: Chris Braden; Stephen Katz; Sheldon Larry; Mario Prizek; Herb Roland
- Country of origin: Canada
- Original language: English
- No. of seasons: 1
- No. of episodes: 8

Production
- Executive producer: Ron Kelly
- Producer: Jack Nixon-Browne
- Running time: 30 minutes

Original release
- Network: CBC Television
- Release: 6 October – 29 December 1976

Royal Suite is a Canadian comedy drama television miniseries that aired on CBC Television in 1976.

== Premise ==
This series is set at a hotel, portraying the lives of its various staff members and guests.

== Scheduling ==
This half-hour series was broadcast Wednesdays at 10:30 p.m. from 6 October to 29 December 1976.

== See also ==
- Plaza Suite
