= Poor Alex Theatre =

Former theatre company in Toronto, Ontario, Canada

Coordinates: 43.652181°N 79.407501°W

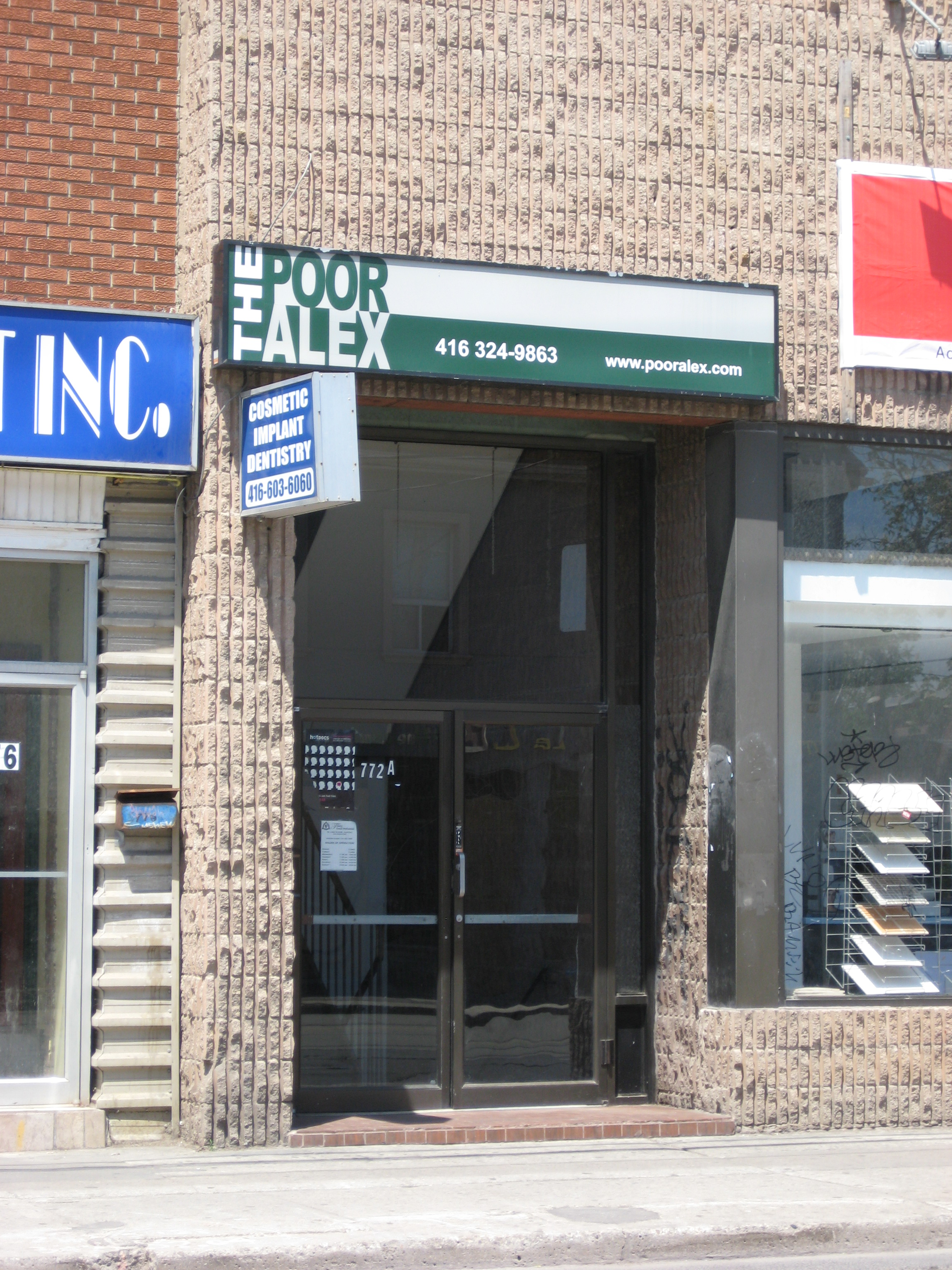
Poor Alex Theatre entrance

Poor Alex Theatre was a theatre company based in Toronto, Ontario, Canada.

The Poor Alex opened in Toronto's Annex neighbourhood in the 1960s in a property owned by Ed Mirvish and took its name as a parody of the Mirvish-owned Royal Alexandra Theatre. A small theatre venue, it hosted a comedy and off-Broadway-style productions and was the original home of the "Jest Society", which later became famous as the Royal Canadian Air Farce.

In 1996, Valerie Morgan (executive producer) took over the theatre and began renovations and equipment upgrades. She publicised the theatre's past and its goals. The Poor Alex Theatre began the Cabaret, welcoming nightly or weekend performances. It became a place to house all types of events.

The location at Brunswick and Bloor was sold in August 2005, and the Poor Alex Theatre moved to 772A Dundas St. W. one block west of Bathurst St. The new venue space with 200 seating capacity was designed for multi-tasking any type of event and rigged with lighting and audio capabilities for a professionally-staged performance.

The Poor Alex closed and the venue is now home to the Hard Luck Bar.

== Notable acts ==
- 1966: The Tickle Trunk, starring Mr. Dressup with Casey and Finnegan
