= Butternut Square =

Canadian children's television series

- Starring: Ernie Coombs
- Country of origin: Canada
- Original language: English
- No. of seasons: 3

Original release
- Network: CBC
- Release: October 19, 1964 – February 10, 1967

Butternut Square is a Canadian children's television series which aired on CBC Television between October 19, 1964 and February 10, 1967. The cast featured Ernie Coombs as Mr. Dressup, whose own landmark television series began production after Butternut Square's run had ended. The show was broadcast in black and white, and originally was 20 minutes until the third (final) season, when it was expanded to a full 30 minutes.

Following Butternut Square's cancellation, Mr. Dressup would get his own series, in the fall of 1967. Two puppets from Butternut Square, Casey and Finnegan, would also join him on that new series, which would run until 1996.

== Other cast ==
- Sandra Cohen as Sandy (1964)
- Donald Himes as The Music Man (1964–1965)
- Robert Jeffrey as Bob (1965–1967)
- Judith Lawrence as Casey/Finnegan/Alexander/Miranda/Mrs. Trapeze (voice)
