= Bob Homme =

American-Canadian television actor (1919–2000)

Bob Homme C.M.
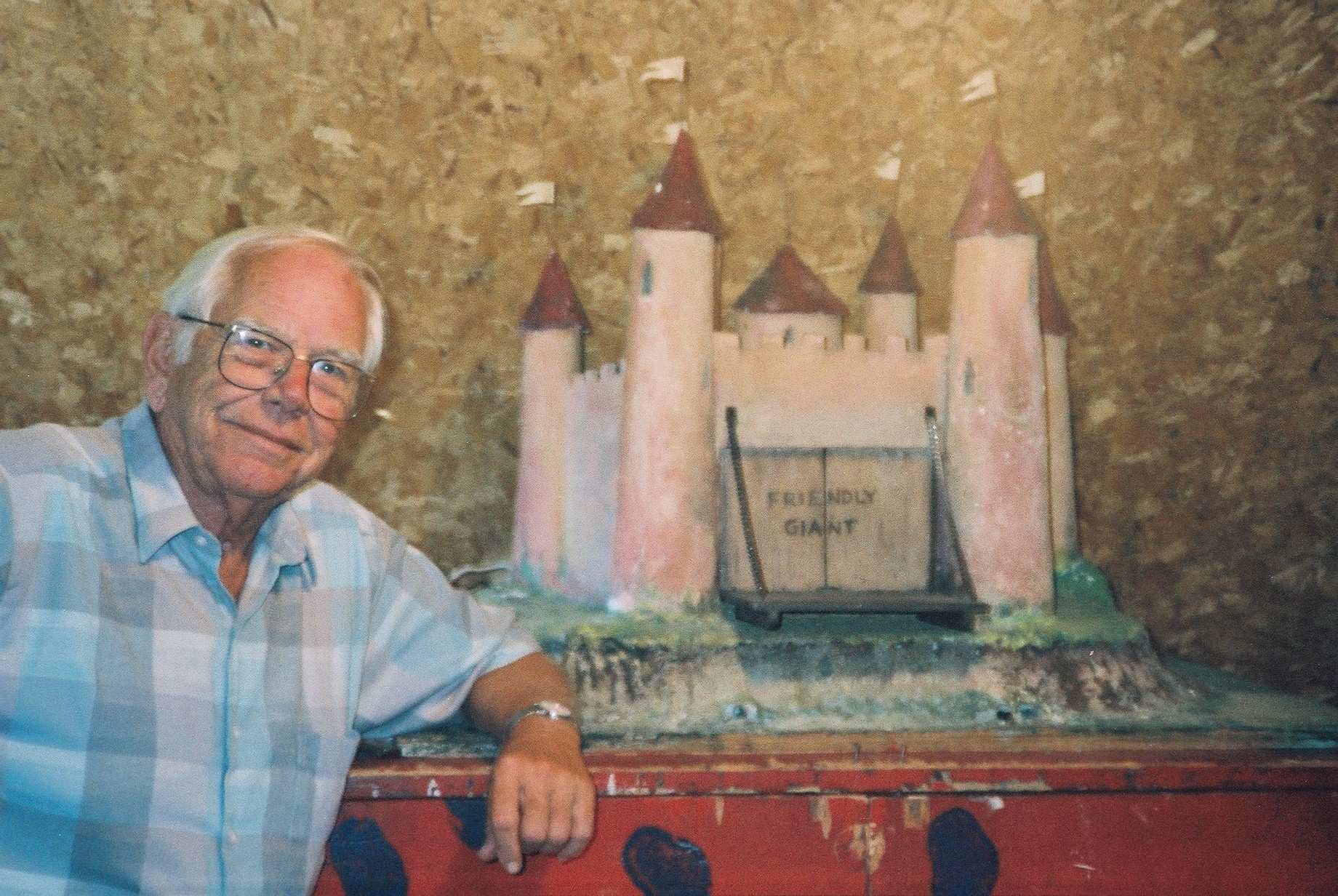
- Homme with The Friendly Giant castle
- Born: Robert Mandt Homme; March 8, 1919; Stoughton, Wisconsin, U.S.
- Died: May 2, 2000 (aged 81); Grafton, Ontario, Canada
- Citizenship: United States; Canada
- Education: University of Wisconsin (BEc); Stoughton High School (High School)
- Occupation: Actor
- Years active: 1954–1984
- Television: The Friendly Giant
- Height: 5 ft 11 in (180 cm)
- Spouse: Esther Eleanor Anderson
- Children: 4

Robert Mandt Homme, C.M. (/ˈhʌmmiː/ HUM-mee; March 8, 1919 – May 2, 2000) was an American-Canadian television actor. Homme was best known as the host of The Friendly Giant, a popular children's television program that aired from the 1950s through the 1980s and was broadcast on CBC Television.

== Background ==
Homme was born in Stoughton, Wisconsin, into a Norwegian family. His parents were high school woodworking teachers, Raymond and Roselyn Homme. He attended elementary school at West Side School before attending Stoughton High School where he graduated in 1937. He enrolled at the University of Wisconsin and graduated with a major in economics. He worked at a bank before joining the Air National Guard. His unit was activated in June 1941, prior to the attack on Pearl Harbor. He was soon promoted to Staff Sergeant, a rank he held for the duration of the war. One of his military assignments was to study psychology at Cornell University. He was later sent to study again at the University of Wisconsin. He finished the war processing and classifying discharging servicemen. Among the notable people he discharged was the actor and director, Captain John Huston.

Following graduation, Homme took a job with the University of Wisconsin State Radio Station WHA.

Homme was married to Esther Eleanor Anderson and had four children: Richard, Ann, Ruth and Peter. Richard was a Toronto-based jazz bassist who died on May 6, 2011.

Singer and voice actress Emilie-Claire Barlow is Homme's stepgranddaughter.

== Career ==
=== The Friendly Giant ===
While working at WHA radio, Homme regularly drove from Madison to Chicago to watch rehearsals of a pioneering network television variety show called The Dave Garroway Show. From these trips, Bob developed an interest in programming. In 1953 as he was driving back from Chicago to Madison, he imagined creating a children's program. His wife Esther came up with the idea of a "friendly giant." Bob recognized that taking what is usually associated with a scary character and making it nice makes it doubly nice. A friendly giant, therefore, becomes an even more friendly giant when compared to the Jack and the Beanstalk variety giant. Homme approached the program director of WHA radio, which was in the process of developing a television station. While continuing to work full-time on radio, he began developing the new children's television show.

The Friendly Giant began on WHA-TV in Madison on May 8, 1954. National Educational Television carried it in the United States from 1955 to 1968. Kinescopes of early episodes caught the attention of the Canadian Broadcasting Corporation, and production of the program moved to CBC Television's Toronto studios in 1958. CBC produced and aired The Friendly Giant until 1986, and it was later run in syndication on Canada's YTV.

The show was outlined but was never scripted. Homme's style was minimalist. He recognized that television was a "hot medium" that tends to exaggerate actions and dialogue. Consistent with his personality, he tended to underplay his performances. This was in contrast to other high-energy early television programs such as Howdy Doody. Bob and his puppeteer partner (originally Ken Ohst in Wisconsin and then Rod Coneybeare in Canada) used the comfortable repartee of old radio programs Bob had enjoyed like Vic and Sade, Burns and Allen, Bob and Ray, and the Easy Aces.

==== Television production innovation ====
One of his television production innovations was to change the perspective of the camera. Instead of the usual camera angles, he had the miniatures raised to camera height and placed the human being (himself) as the unusual shot above the set, giving the impression of a giant. Using a tight cover-shot and a loose close-up might have violated the newly established rules of television, but in this case it worked. It contrasts with the Godzilla effect in which a full-size monster walks around a miniature set. Homme always kept the giant character somewhere in the shot to emotionally reassure his preschool audience and to minimize the jarring effect of appearing suddenly.

=== Music ===
Growing up in a musical family, they enjoyed singing together and performing for the extended family each other on a Saturday night. Young Homme and his father had a little vaudeville act that was available when needed in the community. He later joined the school band at the University of Wisconsin. While Bob is best known for playing the recorder, his first instruments were the clarinet and the saxophone. He first purchased a recorder while stationed in New York City during his military service to give him an inexpensive and portable instrument during his travels. The recorder would become his signature instrument. On each episode of the show, he played three different recorders to match the pitch of each to the desired tone at that stage of the show.

=== Other ===
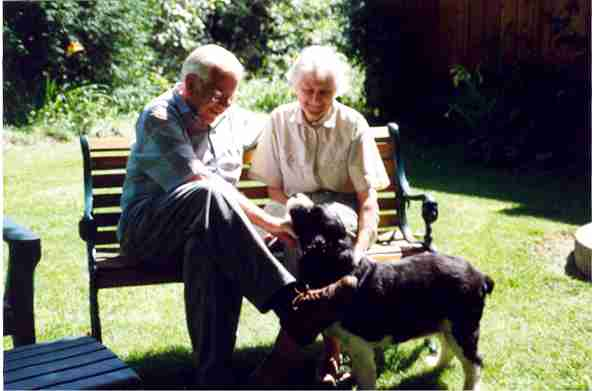
An image of Homme, his wife, Esther, and their dog, Molly, during retirement.

Bob Homme was the model in a number of paintings by his friend and Canadian artist, James Lumbers. Lumbers' "Moments in Time" paintings often featured images from the present together with a faded image of a person and things from the past at the same location. Homme's likeness was used in the images of grandfather types in these paintings such as "Lucky Strike" and "Gone Fishing." The Springer spaniel in "Old Friends" was the Homme's dog, Molly. In one painting of a honky-tonk piano player called "Billy Nine Fingers," Bob and Esther are one of the couples sitting at a table in the foreground.

== Later life and retirement ==
Bob and Esther Homme retired to a rural property near Grafton, Ontario. In retirement, Bob joined the Cobourg Rotary Club and was active as a member. He and fellow Rotarian Wally Reid formed a group called "Time Share", performing music in area retirement and nursing homes.

Homme became a citizen of Canada in the early 1990s, holding both American and Canadian citizenships, and was invested into the Order of Canada as a Member on November 2, 1998, in Grafton. As Homme was too ill to travel, the Governor General Roméo LeBlanc travelled to Grafton to present it, instead of Homme going to Rideau Hall where the award is usually bestowed).

== Death ==
Homme died on May 2, 2000, of prostate cancer. He was 81 years old. He is buried at the Fairview Cemetery, Grafton, Northumberland, Ontario, Canada.

== Biography ==
- Grant D. Fairley. (2010).The Friendly Giant: The Biography of Robert Homme. Toronto, Ontario: Silverwoods Publishing.
