= Rod Coneybeare =

Canadian actor (1930–2019)

- Born: March 31, 1930; Belleville, Ontario, Canada
- Died: September 5, 2019 (aged 89); Lindsay, Ontario, Canada
- Occupations: Voice actor, puppeteer

Rod Coneybeare (March 31, 1930 – September 5, 2019) was a Canadian writer, puppeteer and voice actor, best known for his work on the long-lived Canadian children's program The Friendly Giant, where he performed as both Jerome the Giraffe, who would appear in the window, and Rusty the rooster, who lived in a book bag.

In April 1959 Coneybeare became the editor-in-chief and host of Man to Man, one of the first CBC radio shows intended specifically for men.

In addition to his work on The Friendly Giant, Coneybeare collaborated with Charles Winter on the radio program The Rod and Charles Show. With Robert Gibbons, producer of Mr. Dressup, Coneybeare created the short-lived 1969 CBC TV series The Bananas.

Coneybeare wrote dozens of original radio dramas for the Canadian Broadcasting Corporation. During the 1950s he wrote original plays which were performed on live television, and in 1978 he won an ACTRA award for his radio fantasy The Man Who Hated Dogs. (He had already won an ACTRA award in 1974 for a radio documentary celebrating the music of Frank Sinatra.) He also wrote Royal Suite.

Coneybeare worked as a voice actor for several cartoons, supplying the voice of Avalanche in X-Men: The Animated Series and several characters in The Adventures of Tintin, Babar, Cadillacs and Dinosaurs, The Busy World of Richard Scarry, Blazing Dragons, Dog City, The Magic School Bus, Little Shop and The Adventures of Super Mario Bros. 3.

He is the father of writer and filmmaker Wilson Coneybeare.
