= David Earle =

Canadian choreographer, dancer and artistic director

- Born: 17 September 1939 (age 87); Toronto, Ontario
- Occupations: Choreographer, dancer, artistic director
- Dancing career
- Current group: Dancetheatre David Earle
- Former groups: Toronto Dance Theatre

David Earle (born 17 September 1939) is a Canadian choreographer, dancer and artistic director. In 1968 Earle was co-founder and co-artistic director of Toronto Dance Theatre alongside Patricia Beatty and Peter Randazzo, where Earle choreographed new modern dance pieces. In 1996 Earle started his own company called Dancetheatre David Earle where he continues to choreograph new works, to teach, and to create with the next generation of modern dancers. David Earle has received many accolades; a member of the Order of Canada, a recipient of the Jean A. Chalmers Award for Distinction in Choreography, also an honorary doctorate degree from Queen’s University in Kingston, Ontario.

== Early life and training ==
David Earle grew up in the suburb of Etobicoke. Earle's dance training began at the age of five with ballet and tap lessons from Toronto teachers Beth Weyms and Fanny Birdsall, debuting at Eaton Auditorium. In 1947, he joined Dorothy Goulding's Toronto Children's Players, where we would act for eleven years.

After graduating High School at Etobicoke Collegiate Institute, David Earle studied Radio and Television Arts for two years at Toronto's Ryerson Polytechnical Institute. At the age of twenty he left Ryerson after a Bolshoi Ballet performance inspired him to dance; he auditioned and was accepted as a scholarship student at Canada's National Ballet School. There he would meet Eurhythmics teacher Donald Himes who introduced him to the Laban technique at, modern dance artist, Yoné Kvietys' studio. David would go on to perform for two years with Kvietys' company.

In New York David Earle studied with Martha Graham. He was a dancer with the José Limón Dance Company for a single season, then assisted with setting up the London Contemporary Dance Theatre in England.

== Toronto Dance Theatre ==
After returning to Toronto Earle co-founded Toronto Dance Theatre with Patricia Beatty and Peter Randazzo in 1968. They agreed to share the role of artistic director and each create choreography for the company. Earle became known for emotional theatricality and attractive ensemble pieces. As time passed Earle assumed a more dominant role in the affairs and choreography of the company.

Earle joined the founders in 1977 to buy St. Enoch’s Church to convert it to the Winchester Street Theatre. In 1979 Earle created the School of Toronto Dance Theatre, a training program for professional modern dancers.

One of Earle’s dances during this time was Miserere, originally part of a larger work called Exit, Nightfall (1981). The piece incorporates liturgical themes and other religious imagery.

Earle and the other founders offered the artistic directorship of the company to Kenny Pearl in 1983.

During this time, Earle continued to choreograph in various places across Canada. In 1984 he created Sacra Conversazione at the Banff School of Fine Arts. The piece touches on themes of mortality and grief and is danced to Mozart’s unfinished Requiem Mass. The piece was later remounted with Toronto Dance Theatre in 1986.

In 1987 Earle returned as Toronto Dance Theatre’s sole artistic director. He continued in this role until 1994, where he became artist-in-residence with the company for two years.

He was profiled in Moze Mossanen's 1987 documentary film Dance for Modern Times, alongside Christopher House, James Kudelka, Ginette Laurin and Danny Grossman.

== Dancetheatre David Earle ==
After leaving Toronto Dance Theatre in 1996 Earle founded a new dance company called Dancetheatre David Earle, in Guelph, Ontario, Canada. His recent work features collaborations with choirs, orchestras and chamber choirs.

In 2014 Earle premiered Exile, performed by three dancers. The piece drew upon traditional modern dance and was danced by young artists.

== Choreography ==
David Earle has choreographed more than 130 works over five decades as founder/artistic director of Dancetheatre David Earle and co-founder/co-artistic director of Toronto Dance Theatre.

YEAR	TITLE	Music	Notes
2014	Exile		
2006	Only 2 For 4 In 5		
2006	Barn Dance		
2006	Pavanne From The Sleeping Beauty		
2006	Shalom		
2006	Partings		
2005	The Heart at Night		
2005	The Bridge of Dreams		
2005	Collecting Light		
2004	The Merman of Orford		
2004	The Death of Enkidu		
2004	A Farther Shore		
2003	Piccolo Teatro or Self Portrait as a Drowned Man		
2003	Jesu, Meine Freude		
2003	Sealevel		
2003	Somewhere I Never Traveled		
2002	A Play of Light		
2002	King David		
2002	Zoroaster		
2002	The Reproaches		
2002	Vanishing Perspectives: parts one and two		
2002	Strip Show		
2001	Richot Mass		
2001	Tango for String Quartet		
2001	Meridian		
2001	Dirait-on		
2001	In Spite of and Because		
2001	Le Minotaur		
2000	L'Histoire du Soldat		
2000	Horizon		
2000	Night/Summer		
2000	The Creatures of Prometheus		
2000	There Was a Song		
1999	Three Winter Prayers		
1999	Imagined Memories		
1999	Ex Voto		
1999	Reunion		
1999	Endangered Worlds		
1998	Vertical Thoughts 3		
1998	Serious Games Part 1		
1998	Serious Games Part 2		
1998	Three Duets for Two Friends		
1998	In Memoriam		
1998	Kyrie		
1997	Walking in Venice		
1997	Danny Boy		
1997	Walking in Venice II		
1997	Last		
1997	Hour of Light		
1997	Une Cantate de Nöel		
1996	Elsewhere		
1996	Maelstrom		
1996	Ark of the Covenant		
1996	Sang		
1995	Furniture		
1995	Stardust		
1994	Three Bach Arias		
1993	Pillow of Grass		
1993	Errata		
1993	The Painter's Dream		
1992	Architecture for the Poor		
1992	Untitled Monument		
1992	Visible Distance: A Bach Suite		
1992	Angels and Victories		
1992	Undetermined Landscape		
1992	The Clay Forest		
1992	Diving for the Moon		
1991	Romeos & Juliets		
1991	The Voice of the Ancient Bard		
1990	Capriccio		
1990	Romance		
1990	Autumn Leaves		
1990	Dreamsend—A Melodrama in 12 Moving Parts		
1990	Openings and Inventions		
1989	Ancient Voices of Children		
1989	El Amor Brujo (Wedded to Witchcraft)		
1989	Schéhérazade		
1988	Palace of Pleasure (or Death by Love)		
1988	La Valse		
1988	Chichester Psalms		
1987	Sunrise		
1987	Cantata {renamed The Triumph of Love, 1988}		
1987	Cloud Garden		
1986	Emotional Geography		
1986	Sacred Garden		
1985	Adagio from "The Theatre of Memory"		
1984	Orpheus and Euridice		
1984	Cape Eternity		
1984	Sacra Conversazione		
1983	Realm		
1983	Court of Miracles		
1982	Ormai		
1982	Dido and Aeneas		
1981	Moonchase		
1981	Exit, Nightfall		
1981	Journey		
1981	Christmas Concerto		
1981	All the Books in Heaven		
1980	Courtyard		
1980	Akhenaten		
1980	La Bilancia		
1980	Frost Watch		
1980	Emozioni		
1979	Time in a Dark Room		
1979	Rejoice in the Lamb		
1979	Raven		
1979	The Wedding Dance		
1978	Courances		
1978	Sweet and Low Down		
1977	Fauré Requiem		
1977	Mythos		
1976	Quartet		
1975	Waltz Suite		
1975	Deux Épigraphes Antiques		
1975	L'Hôtel Splendide		
1975	Vignette		
1975	Field of Dreams		
1974	Bugs		
1974	Parade		
1973	Ray Charles Suite		
1973	Baroque Suite Finale		
1973	Atlantis		
1972	Lyrical Solo		
1972	Baroque Suite Duet		
1972	Lament		
1972	Boat, River, Moon		
1971	Balleto al Mio Bel Suon		
1971	Legend		
1971	The Silent Feast		
1970	Operetta		
1970	Portrait		
1970	Pie Jesu		
1969	Lovers		
1969	Fire in the Eye of God		
1969	A Thread of Sand		
1968	Angelic Visitation #1		
1968	Angelic Visitation #2		
1968	The Recitation		
1968	Mirrors		
1967	Witness of Innocence		
1963	Recitative and Aria		

== Accolades ==
- 2012 - Queen’s Diamond Jubilee Medal
- 2011 - Premier’s Award for Excellence in the Arts, Laureate
- 2009 - Premier’s Award for Excellence in the Arts, Individual Category
- 2006 - Walter Carsen Prize for excellence in the performing arts
- 2005 - Honorary Doctorate of Laws, Queen's University, Kingston, Ontario
- 2002 - Jacqueline Lemieux Prize, Canada Council for the Arts
- 1998 - Muriel Sherrin Award, Toronto Arts Council Foundation
- 1996 - The Order of Canada
- 1994 - Jean A. Chalmers Award for Distinction in Choreography.
- 1988 - Toronto Arts Award for Performing Arts - Toronto Dance Theatre co-founders David Earle, Patricia Beatty and Peter Randazzo.
- 1987 - Clifford E. Lee Award from the Banff Centre for the Arts
- 1987 - Dora Mavor Moore Award for best new choreography for Sunrise.
- "[ David Earle's ]... work Sacra Conversazione has been selected by Canadian dance professionals as one of ten Canadian choreographic masterworks of the twentieth century."
