= James Lumbers =

Canadian artist (born 1929)

James Lumbers (born 1929) is a Canadian artist. Originally from Toronto, Ontario, he now lives on Georgian Bay, in Ontario. He is known for his wilderness landscapes, nostalgic images of Canada's past, and portraits, including his heritage Moments in Time series combining historical photographs and records with present-day imagery to create historical tributes.

In 1973, Lumbers was elected a Fellow of the Explorers Club of New York, and also became a member of the New York Society of Animal Artists. He has been included in Who's Who in American Art and a Dictionary of International Biographies in the United Kingdom.

In 1991, Lumbers established a publishing company to publish his work and the work of other Canadian artists. In 1993, a book was published collecting his work up to that time.
