= Judith Lawrence =

Canadian puppeteer (born 1932)

- Born: 1932 (age 93–94); Bairnsdale, Victoria, Australia
- Occupation: Puppeteer
- Employer: Canadian Broadcasting Corporation
- Television: Mr. Dressup

Judith A. Lawrence CM (born 1932) is an Australian-born Canadian puppeteer associated with the long-running CBC children's television program Mr. Dressup. Her best known characters were Casey and Finnegan, although she also created other occasional characters, such as Aunt Bird and Alligator Al.

Lawrence was born in Bairnsdale, Victoria, Australia and grew up in Ballarat, Victoria, Australia. She came to Canada in 1956, earning her living as a kindergarten teacher. She taught at Cockcroft Public School in Deep River, Ontario.

After a successful audition, Lawrence started work for the CBC, where she soon created her most famous puppet characters for the Butternut Square TV series and they made the transition to Mr. Dressup. Lawrence retired as the puppeteer of the show in 1989.

She also wrote many books in The Young Canada Reading Series for Thomas Nelson publishers. Lawrence co-authored a series of books for D.C. Heath on women and work.

In 1960, she co-founded The Voice of Women. In the 1970s, she was on the first National Action Committee on the Status of Women (NAC). She continued her peace and feminist activism through newspapers like Broadside: A Feminist Review, which she helped found. She was awarded the Order of Canada in 2001 for her work as both a puppeteer and an activist.

After retiring, Lawrence moved from Toronto to Hornby Island, British Columbia with her partner, Thea Jensen, in 1990 where she became a strong community leader for the island, a designer of the recycling depot, and a farmer/environmentalist.

Her work on Mr. Dressup was profiled as part of the 2023 documentary film Mr. Dressup: The Magic of Make-Believe.
