= Robert McCallum (director) =

Robert McCallum is a Canadian documentary film director from London, Ontario. He is most noted for his 2023 film Mr. Dressup: The Magic of Make-Believe, which premiered at the 2023 Toronto International Film Festival and was the winner of the People's Choice Award for Documentaries.

He has been known predominantly for cultural documentaries, focusing largely but not exclusively on fan culture scenes such as heavy metal music, video games and comic books.

His films have included Missing Mom, a personal documentary about his own search for his missing mother which won the award for Best Feature Documentary at the 2016 Forest City Film Festival, and Power of Grayskull: The Definitive History of He-Man and the Masters of the Universe.
