= Mr. Dressup =

Canadian children's television series

- Mr. Dressup, Casey, and Finnegan
- Created by: Ernie Coombs
- Starring: Ernie Coombs; Judith Lawrence
- Theme music composer: Donald Himes
- Country of origin: Canada
- Original language: English
- No. of seasons: 29
- No. of episodes: 4,000

Production
- Producer: Daniel McCarthy
- Production locations: CBC studios at 400 Jarvis Street, Toronto, Ontario (1967–1992); Canadian Broadcasting Centre, Toronto, Ontario (1992–1996)
- Running time: 26 minutes

Original release
- Network: CBC
- Release: February 13, 1967 – February 14, 1996

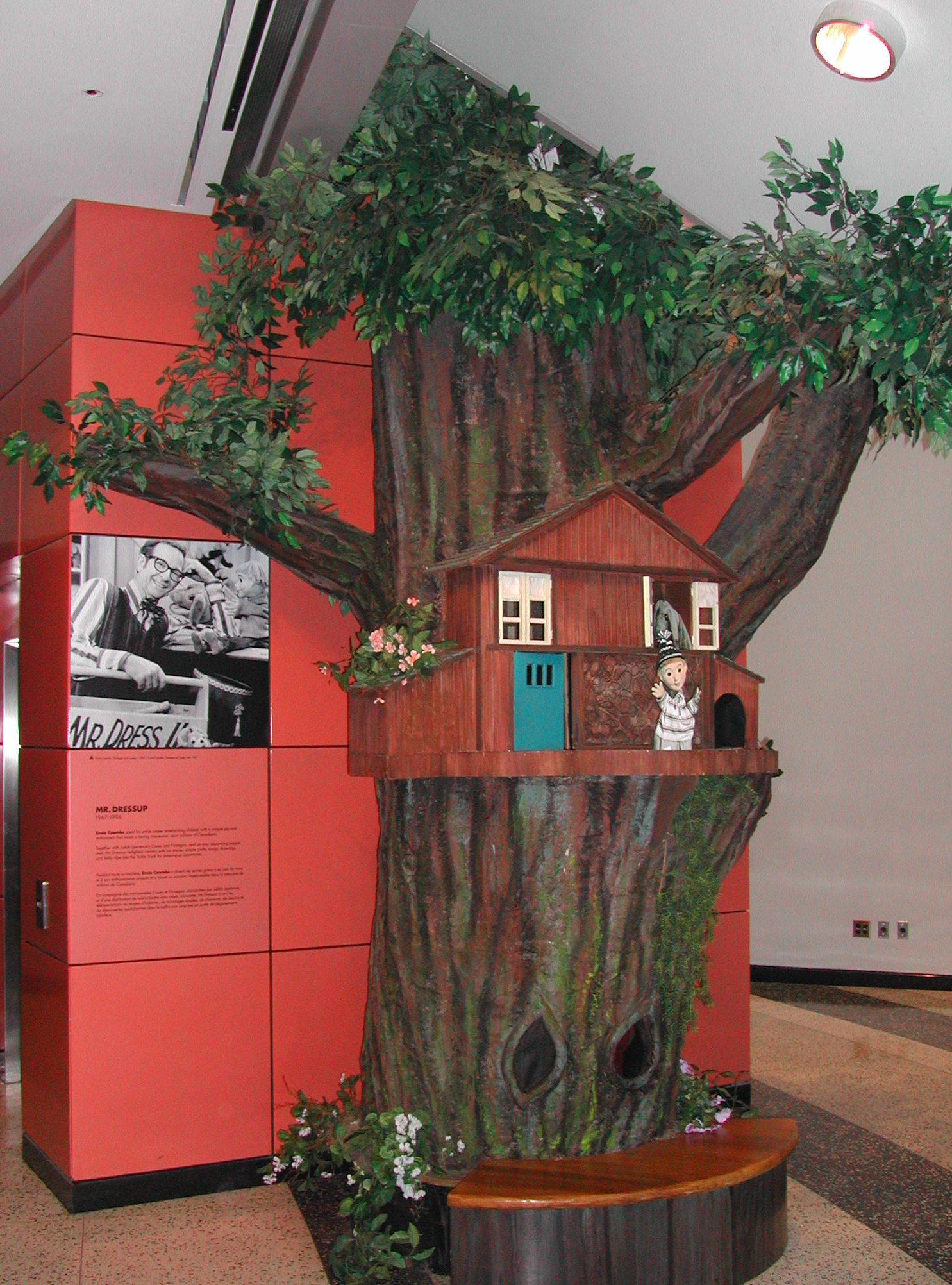
Photograph of the tree house set from Mr. Dressup in the foyer of the Canadian Broadcasting Centre, Toronto.

Mr. Dressup is a Canadian children's television series, starring Ernie Coombs, a former understudy of Fred Rogers, in the title role. It ran on CBC from 1967 to 1996, soon becoming an iconic presence in Canadian media.

== Production ==
Mr. Dressup was developed and produced by Daniel McCarthy, who later became the head of children's programming for CBC Television, as a replacement for Butternut Square, on which Mr. Dressup had been a featured character.

== Premise ==
The series starred the actor Ernie Coombs as Mr. Dressup. The show aired every weekday morning, Mr. Dressup would lead children through a series of songs, stories, arts, crafts and imagination games, with the help of his puppet friends—a boy named Casey and a dog named Finnegan—who lived with him and often played in the tree-house in Mr. Dressup's backyard. Some critics likened the series to the American series Mister Rogers' Neighborhood, which started being broadcast a year later in 1968 on the U.S. network PBS and was produced by Coombs' former professional associate, Fred Rogers. Judith Lawrence was the puppeteer who created Casey and Finnegan, along with other occasional puppet visitors such as Alligator Al and Aunt Bird.

The set for the show included the inside of Mr. Dressup's house, with scenes shot in the living room, kitchen and a playroom. This included the Tickle Trunk (where costumes used in make-believe skits were stored) and a long counter where Casey and Finnegan often appeared. Sometimes, the action moved outside to Casey's and Finnegan's tree house. Typically during a segment, Mr. Dressup would get a costume from the Tickle Trunk, such as one for an animal, policeman or fireman. Donning the costume, he would play the suggested role. Occasionally, when the Tickle Trunk would not open, Mr. Dressup sang a song and tickled the lock, hence its name. The trunk appeared to be magical as it always had the right costumes, in the right sizes, neatly folded at the top of the piles of costumes. Occasionally, Mr. Dressup would need to make an accessory for his costume, which would lead to a craft. Mr. Dressup would draw or make a craft and would sing a song with Casey and Finnegan. On occasion, Mr. Dressup would also read a book or show a short documentary to the audience. The films were usually silent and Mr. Dressup narrated. He often drew pictures on his drawing board to either illustrate a short story or to play a game with one of his visitors. He would frequently encourage children to try the craft at home or to sing along with the songs.

In later years, Judith Lawrence chose to retire from the show. Rather than cast a new puppeteer in the roles of Casey and Finnegan, a team of new puppeteers was brought in. They hired Karen Valleau (Chester the Crow), Nina Keogh (Truffles), Jani Lauzon (Granny), Ruth Danziger (Annie), Jim Parker (Alex), and Bob Dermer (Lorenzo the Raccoon). These new characters visited Mr. Dressup and, over time, became the lead puppet characters, with Casey and Finnegan gradually being removed from the show. This was done gradually for a transition before Lawrence's retirement.

When Casey and Finnegan stopped appearing on the show, an announcement was made that they were attending kindergarten. With the new characters came new sets, including the community centre. During the last 10 years of the show, singer, musician and Yo-Yo champion Mark Kersey appeared as recurring character "Mark the Repairman".

== Conclusion ==
The final episode of Mr. Dressup was taped on February 14, 1996, though Coombs, Valleau, and Keogh returned to star in the 2½ hour long Mr. Dressup's Holiday Special for CBC in 1997, where Mr. Dressup played Santa Claus at the Hospital for Sick Children in Toronto while showing other Christmas specials and Canadian short cartoons. Coombs spent most of the next few years touring college campuses giving talks about his time on the show aimed at students who grew up with his series. He died of a stroke at the age of 73, on September 18, 2001, in Toronto, Ontario.

== Legacy and honours ==
Rebroadcasts of the series continued for a decade after it ended, until CBC announced that it was taking Mr. Dressup out of its weekday morning lineup and moving it to Sunday mornings, effective July 3, 2006. The final repeat aired on September 3, 2006. In 2017, episodes from the series were included on encore+, a YouTube channel run by the Canada Media Fund and Google Canada. Although the five episodes made available on YouTube in 2017 were deleted in June 2018, they were re-posted a month later in July 2018.

A three DVD box set of selected episodes, entitled Mr. Dressup: Tickle Trunk Treasures, was released in 2002, with Judith Lawrence coming out of retirement to play Casey and Finnegan in new introductions for the set.

Due to the long run of the series, several generations of Canadian children, as well as Americans growing up in northern United States regions that received the CBC signal, grew up watching Mr. Dressup and his adventures. Ernie Coombs and the character of Mr. Dressup have become strong Canadian icons and a part of Canadian pop culture.

In 2010, two elements of the series were preserved for public viewing. They were Casey's tree house, which is on display in the Canadian Broadcasting Centre in Downtown Toronto, and the Tickle Trunk (with assorted props), which was previously on display in the CBC Museum, close to where the tree house is located. The Tickle Trunk was not placed in another museum after the CBC Museum closed.

On 26 November 2012, Mr. Dressup, along with Casey and Finnegan, were featured in a Google Doodle on the Canadian Google website as a tribute to Coombs' 85th birthday.

In September 2022, Amazon Prime Video greenlit a documentary about the show. Mr. Dressup: The Magic of Make-Believe, directed by Robert McCallum, premiered at the 2023 Toronto International Film Festival, where it won the People's Choice Award for Documentaries. The widely anticipated documentary premiered on Amazon Prime October 10, 2023.

In coverage of the documentary, McCallum claimed the significance of Casey as a pioneer of LGBTQ representation in children's television. Although Mr. Dressup referred to Casey as "he" or "him" in the show, Lawrence, Casey's creator and puppeteer, said that Casey was a character that both boys and girls could relate to. She stated in the film that when she was asked if Casey was a boy or a girl, she would just answer "yes".

== Discography ==
- Mr. Dress Up (1970)
- Mr. Dressup: Happy Birthday Alligator Al (1976)
- Mr. Dressup and Friends: For a Song (1979)
- Wake Up Mr. Dressup! (1982)
- Favourite Songs (1990)
