= Patricia Beatty =

Canadian choreographer (1936–2020)

- Born: May 13, 1936; Toronto, Ontario, Canada
- Died: November 20, 2020 (aged 84)
- Education: Bennington College; Martha Graham School
- Occupations: Choreographer, dancer, director and teacher
- Awards: Order of Canada (2004)

Patricia Beatty, CM (13 May 1936 – 20 November 2020) was a Canadian choreographer, dancer, director and teacher.

== Early life and education ==
Patricia Beatty was born in Toronto. She studied modern dance at Bennington College in Bennington, Vermont and graduated in 1959. She studied at various schools in New York City, but most influential were José Limón and the Martha Graham School.

== Career ==
Viewed as a seminal figure within modern-dance performance in Canada, she notably co-founded the Toronto Dance Theatre in Toronto, Ontario with David Earle and Peter Randazzo, in 1968. In 2002 she also co-founded the Toronto Heritage Dance company.

== Awards and honors ==
She was named a Member of the Order of Canada in 2004.
