= Peter Randazzo =

American dancer and choreographer (born 1943)

Peter Randazzo (born January 2, 1943, in Brooklyn) is an American dancer and choreographer known for his contributions to modern dance. From 1962–1968 he was a principal dancer with the Martha Graham Dance Company. In 1968 he co-founded the Toronto Dance Theatre (TDT) and its associated school, The School of Toronto Dance Theatre, with fellow Martha Graham disciples Patricia Beatty and David Earle. A prolific choreographer, the TDT has featured his works in performances internationally for more than 40 years.
