= Toronto Dance Theatre =

General information
- Name: Toronto Dance Theatre
- Local name: TDT
- Year founded: 1968
- Founder: Patricia Beatty, David Earle, Peter Randazzo
- Location: Toronto, Ontario, Canada
- Website: https://tdt.org/

Artistic staff
- Artistic Director: Andrew Tay

Other
- Official school: The School of Toronto Dance Theatre

Toronto Dance Theatre (TDT) is a Canadian modern dance company based in Toronto, Ontario. Described by The Canadian Encyclopedia as "one of the foremost modern-dance companies in Canada", the company tours nationally and internationally and regularly performs at the Harbourfront Centre and Winchester Street Theatre in Toronto. The company currently consists of nine dancers and two dance interns in addition to other artistic staff. The ensemble has been led by Artistic Director Christopher House since 1994.

The TDT was co-founded in 1968 by Martha Graham disciples Patricia Beatty, David Earle, and Peter Randazzo. All three formally shared the artistic directorship of the company during its first 15 years, although Earle played a more dominant role as a leader for the company. The trio created more than 60 choreographed works during their tenure; often with original scores by Canadian composers.

At the time of TDT's founding, The School of Toronto Dance Theatre was also established as part of the organization. In 1978 the school became its own separate institution under Earle's leadership, but the two organizations still maintain an affiliation.

In 1981 the company participated alongside the National Ballet of Canada, Les Grands Ballets Canadiens, the Royal Winnipeg Ballet, le Groupe de la Place Royale, the Danny Grossman Dance Company, Winnipeg Contemporary Dancers and the Anna Wyman Dance Theatre in the Canadian Dance Spectacular, a dance show at Ottawa's National Arts Centre which was filmed by the National Film Board of Canada for the 1982 documentary film Gala.
