= Moze Mossanen =

Canadian writer, director and producer

- Occupations: Director, writer, producer
- Awards: Gemini Award for Best Direction, "Nureyev"; Chris Award for "Dance for Modern Times"; Jury Award at Yorkton for "Year of the Lion"; Golden Sheaf for Best Best Arts and Entertainment for "Roxana; Golden Sheaf for Best Arts & Entertainment for "Nureyev"; Canadian Screen Award for "Unsung: Behind the Glee"; Audience Choice Award for Best Documentary at CineFest for "You Are Here: A Come From Away Story".

Moze Mossanen is a Canadian independent writer, director and producer who has created a body of critically acclaimed film and TV work blending drama, music, performance and documentary. Most recently, he wrote and directed the documentary feature, You Are Here: A Come From Away Story. His other works include Year of the Lion, a dance film adaptation of the novel, Dangerous Liaisons, and Nureyev, a docu-drama about the life of the Russian dancer Rudolf Nureyev.

== Early life ==
Mossanen was born in Tehran, Iran to a Jewish family, and lived in England before emigrating to Canada. He attended Ryerson University, where he studied filmmaking.

== Early works ==
After studying at the Lee Strasberg Theatre Institute and the Actors Studio in New York, Moze Mossanen created a theatre company entitled Theatre One and under its auspices produced and directed a production of Cabaret at the U.C. Playhouse in Toronto. Mossanen next directed two short films, Illegal Acts and Canciones, which brought him to the attention of the CBC.

== Breakthrough into film ==
Dance for Modern Times (1987) was Mossanen's first feature-length documentary, released theatrically and aired on CBC Television. This critically acclaimed film was acknowledged as one of the finest performing arts films made in Canada. It was nominated for a Genie Award and won the Chris Award at the Columbus International Film Festival. During the same year, Mossanen also wrote, produced and directed The Dancemakers, a series of six half-hour programs on contemporary choreographers which aired on the CBC, TVOntario, and on networks in Europe, Asia and Australia.

For CBC Television's Arts and Entertainment series, Mossanen produced and directed several specials including Shades of Blue, a well-received documentary on Toronto's blues music scene; The Photography of Cylla Von Tiedemann, a profile of the German-born photographer; and Jackie Richardson: A Night In August, a made-for-TV concert featuring the blues and jazz singer.

== Later works ==
In 1998, Mossanen completed The Golden City, a film the National Post's film critic, Michael Crabb, reviewed as "a magical, almost existential meditation on the interaction of character and environment." The film was broadcast on Bravo! and TVO in June of that year. Mossanen received a Gemini nomination for Best Direction in Performing Arts Program for this work. My Gentleman Friends, Mossanen's first hour-long TV drama, aired on Bravo! in April 1999 and was singled out as one of the outstanding programs of the year, and for which Mossanen received a Gemini nomination for Best Writing in a Dramatic Program.

His next film, The Rings of Saturn, a well-received exploration of desire and loss set within the lives of five urban couples, was broadcast in January 2002 on CBC and Bravo! and received a Best Performance Gemini Award nomination for one of its lead players, Julia Aplin. CBC and Bravo! also broadcast Mossanen's Year of the Lion in January 2003. Loosely based on Choderlos de Laclos' controversial 1782 novel, Les Liaisons dangereuses, the film aired in January 2003 and won the Jury Award at the Yorkton Film Festival in June of the same year. The film was nominated for five Gemini Awards, winning three awards for cinematography, editing and original score.

Bravo! aired an evening-long retrospective of his film works in March 2004 which coincided with the broadcast of his film From Time to Time, a collaboration with the music of Joni Mitchell. The film, which premiered originally on CBC, was selected for competition at the FIPA festival in Biarritz in January 2005 and was nominated for three Gemini Awards.

His award-winning film, Roxana, based on the novel by Daniel Defoe, was broadcast on CBC and Bravo! in February 2007. The film opened the Moving Pictures Festival in November 2006 and was selected for the competition sections of the FIPA festival in Biarritz and FamaFest in Portugal in 2007. The film won two awards at the Yorkton Film Festival, a Canadian Cinematography Award and two Gemini Awards, including nominations for Best Dramatic Writing and Best Performing Arts Program for Mossanen. Meanwhile, Mossanen directed an episode of the Disney comedy Life With Derek, for which he received a Directors Guild of Canada nomination.

Nureyev, based on the life of the Russian dancer who defected to the West in 1961, aired on Bravo! and CTV in December 2009. The film, a docu-drama told almost entirely through performance, music and dramatic monologues, was called "a triumph" by The Globe and Mail and won the Golden Sheaf Award for Best Arts and Entertainment Program at the Yorkton Film Festival in May 2010. The film also received six Gemini Award nominations, including nods for Best Performing Arts Program and Best Writing in a Dramatic Program for Moze. He won the Gemini Award for Best Direction in a Performing Arts Program or Series for this film on November 2, 2010.

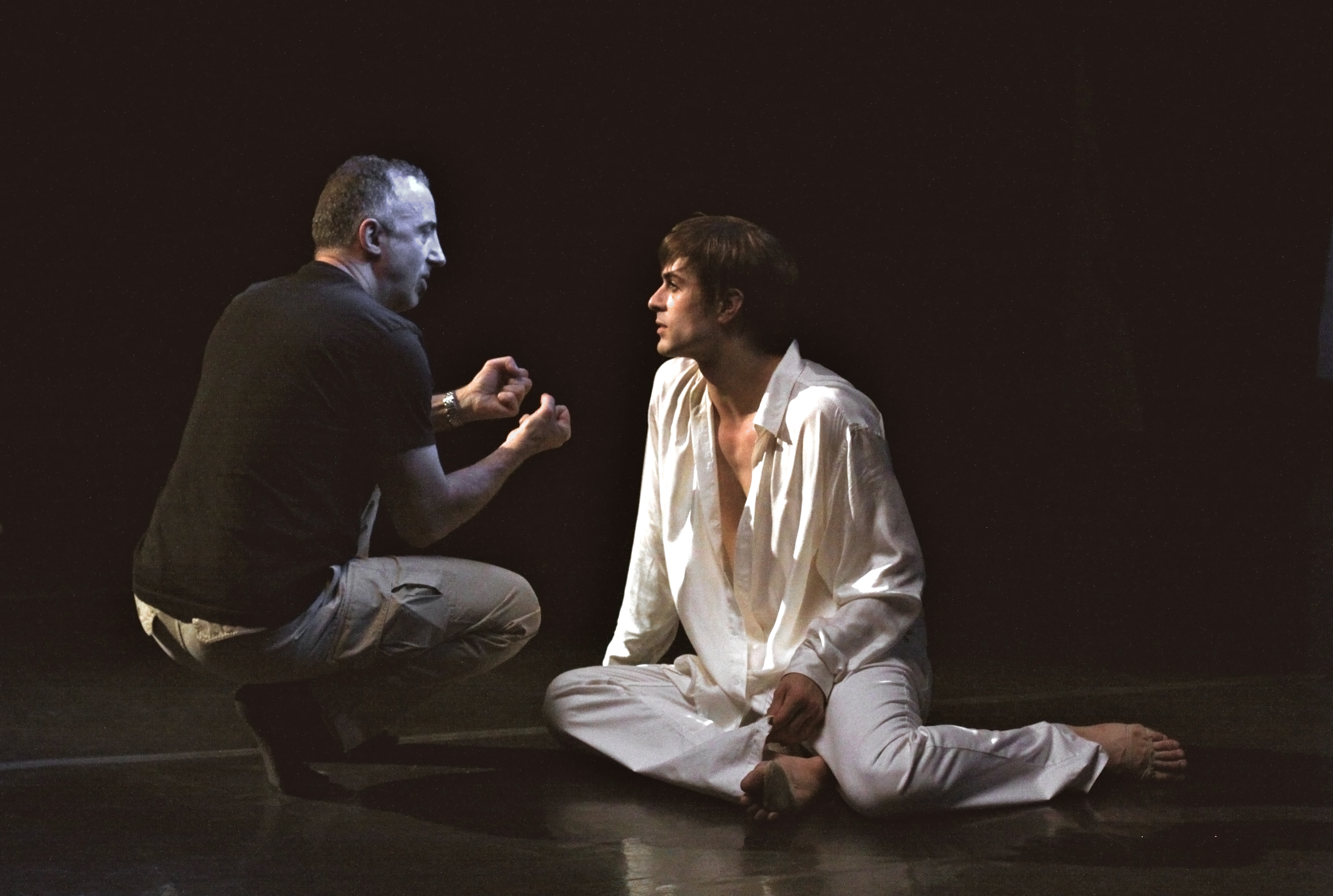
Director Moze Mossanen with Nico Archambault on the set of Nureyev, 2009

Also in 2010, Mossanen directed an episode of Baxter which premiered for Family Channel. His next films, Love Lies Bleeding (a musical special based on the life of Elton John) and Romeos & Juliets (a prime time documentary exploring the National Ballet of Canada's new production of Romeo and Juliet), both aired on CBC in 2012. While he was nominated in a directing category for Romeos & Juliets, Love Lies Bleeding was awarded a Canadian Screen Award for Best Cinematography in a Performing Arts Program in March 2013. His subsequent film, Unsung: Behind the Glee, a one-hour documentary on the world of show choirs (a form made popular by the TV show, Glee), aired on TVO on December 4, 2013, for which he won the Canadian Screen Award. The film (co-produced with Shaftesbury and Show Choir Canada) was also nominated for the Shaw Rocket Prize.

In 2013, Mossanen also directed and co-created Rise, a dramatic digital pilot for ABC Spark, which is currently live and online at ABCSpark.ca. Mossanen has also written extensively for Point of View and Dance Current Magazine, two national publications. His two most recent projects, both released in 2018, are: My Piece of the City, a feature doc for CBC about youths in the inner city community of Toronto's Regent Park; and the feature documentary You Are Here for HBO Canada about the closing of the US airspace on 9/11 when 38 airliners were forced to land in Gander, Newfoundland, a story that eventually inspired the Broadway musical Come From Away.

"You Are Here" won the Audience Award for Best Feature Documentary at CineFest in October 2018 and became the highest-rated original program on HBO Canada for the same year. The film also won the CSA Award for Best Documentary Program as well as the CSA Award for Best Editing in a Documentary Program in March 2109. The film went on to win the Jury Prize at the Banff World Media Festival in June 2019. On September 11, 2019, Fathom Events released the film in over 800 cinemas across the United States. The New York Times praised the film by saying: "The documentary's emotional power has the same source as "Come From Away" — the poignant knowledge that in a fearful moment, citizens of one nation embraced strangers, sharing what they had to make their visitors feel at home."
